= USS America (CV-66) =

Kitty Hawk-class super carrier (1965–1996)

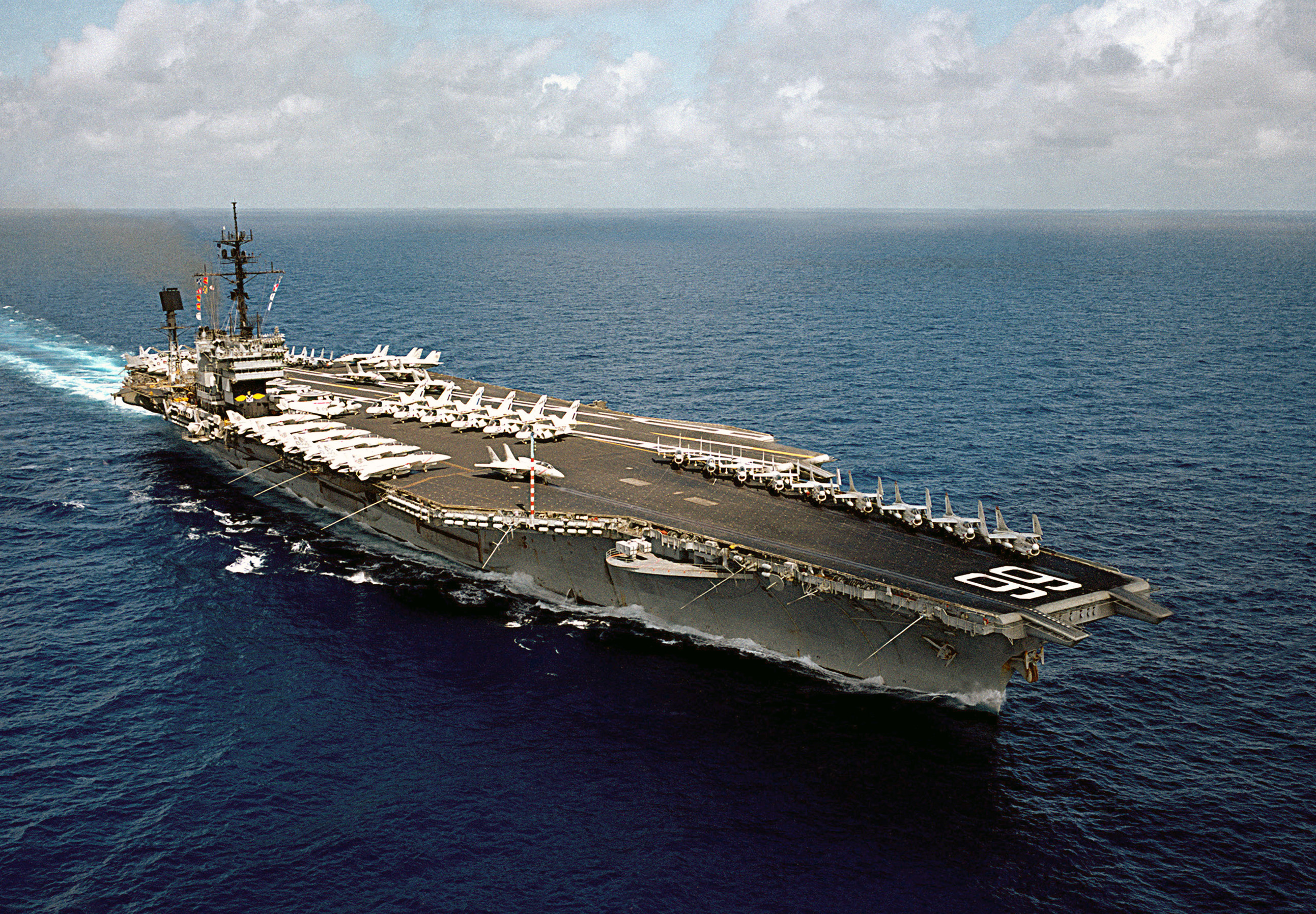
- USS America underway on 24 April 1983

History

United States
- Name: America
- Namesake: United States of America
- Ordered: 25 November 1960
- Builder: Newport News Shipbuilding
- Laid down: 9 January 1961
- Launched: 1 February 1964
- Sponsored by: Catherine McDonald
- Christened: 1 February 1964
- Acquired: 13 January 1965
- Commissioned: 23 January 1965
- Decommissioned: 9 August 1996
- Reclassified: CV-66, 30 June 1975
- Stricken: 9 August 1996
- Home port: Norfolk, Virginia
- Motto: Don't Tread on Me
- Nickname(s): The Big "A"
- Fate: Scuttled after live-fire testing 14 May 2005
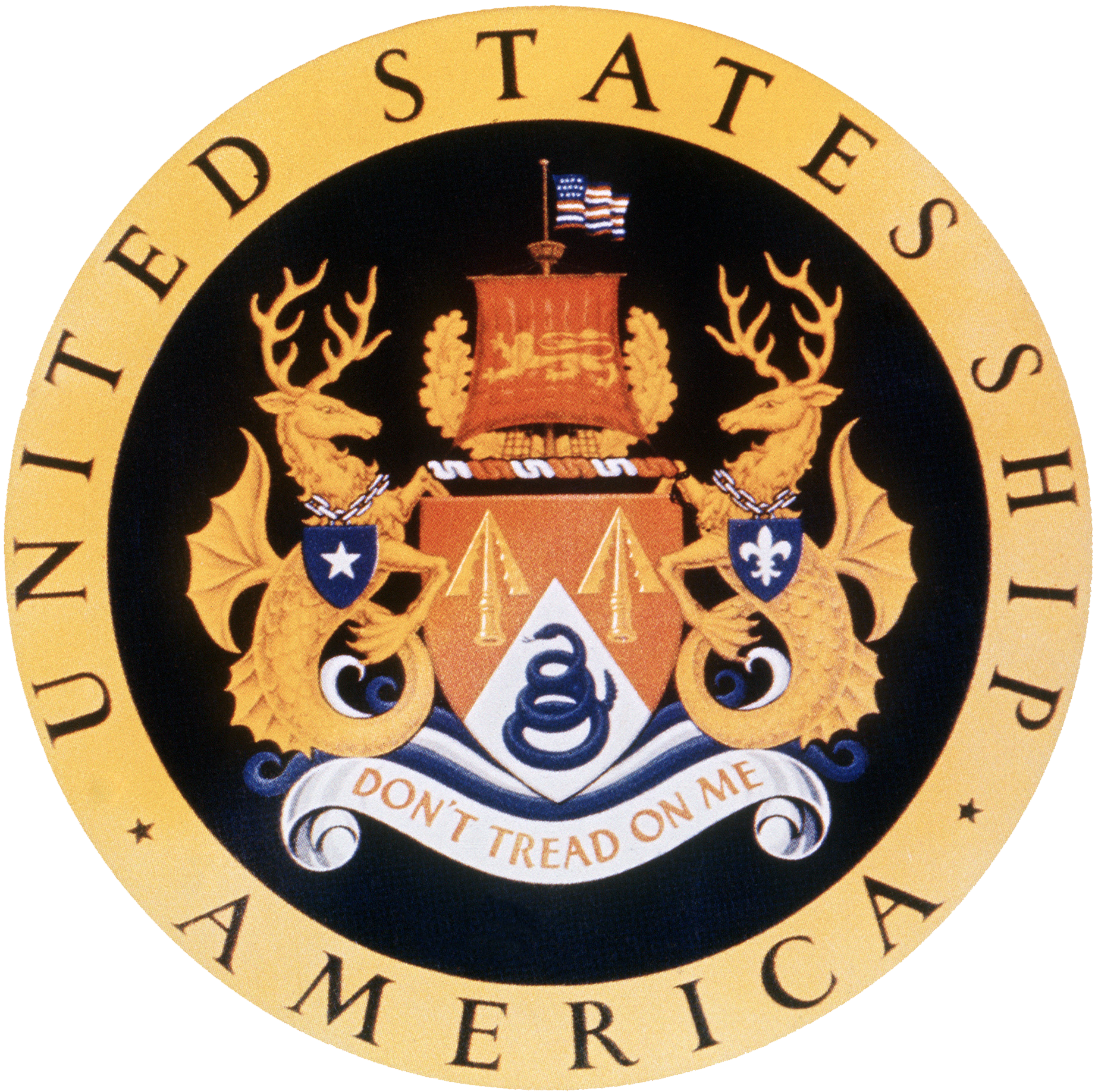
- Badge

General characteristics
- Class & type: Kitty Hawk-class aircraft carrier
- Displacement: 61,174 long tons (62,156 t) (light); 83,573 long tons (84,914 t) (full load)
- Length: 990 ft (300 m) (waterline); 1,048 ft (319 m) overall
- Beam: 248 ft (76 m) extreme; 129 ft (39 m) waterline
- Draft: 38 ft (12 m) (maximum); 37 ft (11 m) (limit)
- Installed power: 280,000 hp (210 MW)
- Propulsion: 4 × steam turbines; 8 × boilers; 4 × shafts
- Speed: 34 knots (63 km/h; 39 mph)
- Complement: 502 officers, 4,684 enlisted
- Sensors & processing systems: AN/SPS-49; AN/SPS-48
- Electronic warfare & decoys: AN/SLQ-32
- Armament: Original armament: 2 × Mark 10 missile launchers for RIM-2 Terrier (Later RIM-67A); 1981-1996: 3 × 8 cell NATO Sea Sparrow Mark 29 missile launchers; 2 × 20 mm Phalanx CIWS
- Aircraft carried: about 79

USS America (hull number CVA/CV-66) was one of three Kitty Hawk-class supercarriers built for the United States Navy in the 1960s. Commissioned in 1965, she spent most of her career operating in the Atlantic Ocean and the Mediterranean Sea, but did make three Pacific Ocean deployments serving in the Vietnam War. She also served in the Persian Gulf War's operations Desert Shield and Desert Storm.

America was the first large aircraft carrier since Operation Crossroads in 1946 to be expended in weapons tests. In 2005, she was scuttled southeast of Cape Hatteras, after four weeks of tests, despite a large protest of former crew members who wanted to see her instituted as a memorial museum. She was the largest warship ever sunk.

== Construction and shakedown ==
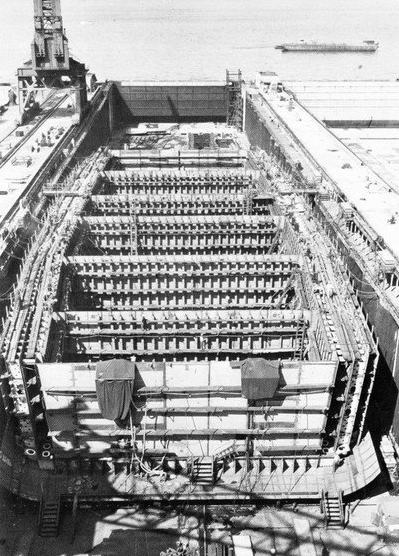
America under construction at Newport News in 1961

Originally ordered as an Enterprise-class nuclear carrier, the ballooning costs of Enterprise during construction caused the cancellation of the nuclear CVAN-66 and her reordering as a conventionally powered Kitty Hawk-class carrier. She was laid down on 1 January 1961 at Newport News, Virginia, by the Newport News Shipbuilding and Dry Dock Corp. The aircraft carrier was launched on 1 February 1964, sponsored by Mrs. Catherine McDonald, the wife of Admiral David L. McDonald, the Chief of Naval Operations. America was commissioned at the Norfolk Naval Shipyard on 23 January 1965, Captain Lawrence Heyworth Jr., in command.

After fitting out there until 15 March 1965, America remained in Hampton Roads for operations off the Virginia Capes until getting underway on 25 March. She conducted her first catapult launch on 5 April. The ship then proceeded to the Caribbean Sea where she conducted shakedown training and concluded it at Guantánamo Bay on 23 June. The ship returned to Norfolk on 10 July and remained there until 21 August. America next operated locally through late August, operating off the Virginia Capes and Bermuda, arriving back at Norfolk on 9 September. On 25 September, Rear Admiral J. O. Cobb broke his flag as Commander, Carrier Division 2 (CarDiv 2).

== Service history ==
On 16 October 1965, a Phantom jet and a North American RA-5C collided in midair 8 miles (13 km) from America, and both crewmembers of the RA-5C ejected safely. The USS Dahlgren picked up the survivors and the remains of the crew of the Phantom. On 3 September 1965 on the way to Taranto, a plane and pilot were lost when the catapult malfunctioned and tore the front landing gear off the plane; the plane's auxiliary fuel tank ruptured, and the plane went over the side. An airman was burned in the catwalk and the RA ejected safely, but the pilot went down with the plane. Since leaving Norfolk, America had lost five planes.

In late 1965, America sailed for her first Mediterranean Sea deployment, returning to the United States in mid-1966. Early in the deployment, from 28 February – 10 March, America participated in a joint Franco-American exercise "Fairgame IV", which simulated conventional warfare against a country attempting to invade a NATO ally. She arrived at Naval Station Norfolk on 10 July. America operated locally in the Norfolk area from 29 August to 19 September, after which time she proceeded to Guantánamo Bay to carry out training.

After Hurricane Inez passed through the region, her sailors aided in the operational recovery of the naval base at Guantanamo. In November, America initiated into carrier service the A-7 Corsair II, conducting its flight qualifications off the Virginia Capes, while she also conducted automatic carrier landing system trials which demonstrated the feasibility of "no hands" landings of F-4 Phantom, F-8 Crusader and A-4 Skyhawk aircraft. From 28 November to 15 December, America took part in "LANTFLEX 66", an exercise in anti-air, anti-submarine, and carrier strike operations. The ship also participated in a naval mine drop and missile shoots, and provided air support for amphibious operations. She returned to Norfolk on 15 December, remaining there to the end of 1966.

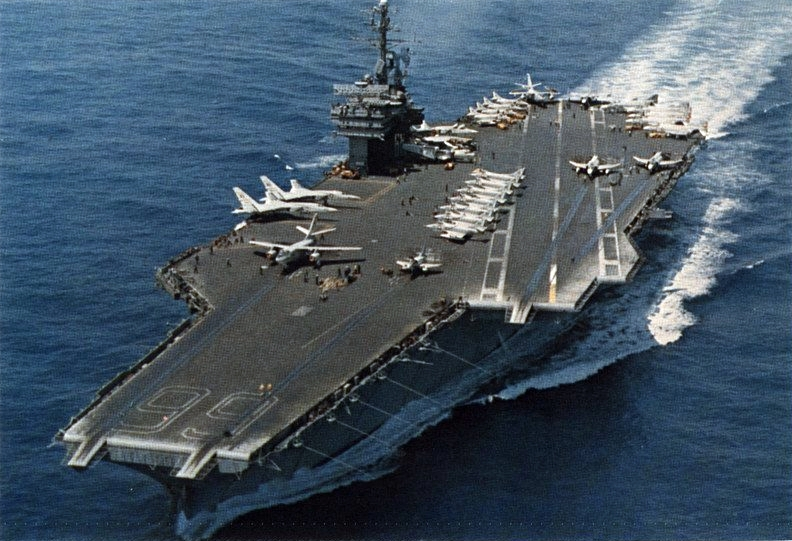
America during her 1967 Mediterranean cruise

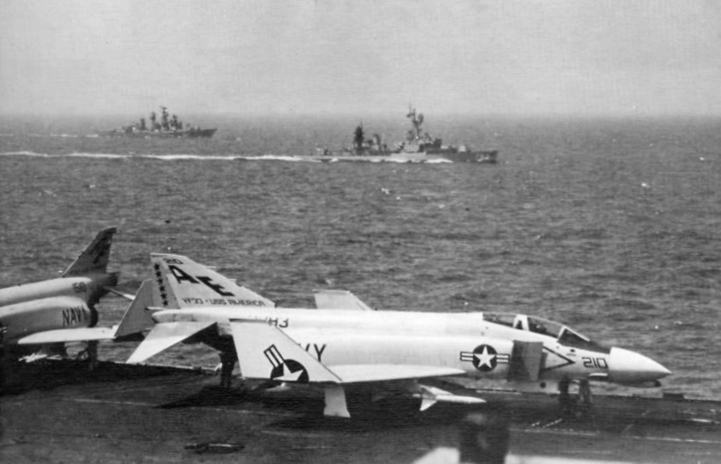
An F-4B Phantom of VF-33 waiting to be launched from America during her 1967 Mediterranean cruise. In the background is the Gearing-class destroyer William C. Lawe, and a Kashin-class destroyer of the Soviet Navy.

On 10 January 1967, America departed Norfolk for her second Mediterranean cruise. She relieved Independence at Pollensa Bay, Spain on 22 January. Upon nearing Gibraltar, she received a visit from Soviet long-range reconnaissance aircraft, Tu-95 "Bears" on 18 January. Two F-4B Phantom jets met the "Bears" as they approached and escorted them past the ship. Before anchoring at Athens, on 4 February, America participated with Italian control and reporting centers in an intercept-controller exercise. Shortly afterwards, she again met with Italian forces in an exercise involving raids upon an attack carrier by fast patrol boats.

In early March, America and her consorts, operating as Task Group 60.1 (TG 60.1) of Task Force 60, participated in the United States/United Kingdom exercise "Poker Hand IV" with the British carrier HMS Hermes. America and Hermes provided raid aircraft to test each other's anti-aircraft defenses. On 1 April, "Dawn Clear", a two-day NATO exercise, commenced with TG 60.1 units participating. During the first day, America provided raid aircraft against Greek and Turkish "targets". The following day, the exercise continued as Greek aircraft flew raids against TG 60.1 surface units. Following "Dawn Clear", the ship conducted routine training operations in the Ionian Sea.

In April America took part in TG 60.1 operations in the Ionian Sea where she conducted an open sea missile exercise with the guided missile destroyers Josephus Daniels and Harry E. Yarnell. While operating in the Ionian Sea, the Greek junta performed military coup that ended parliamentary rule in Greece. America was tasked to with supporting US forces in preparation for an evacuation of US citizens in case of civil war. America remained in the area as the crisis was resolved, operating in the Ionian and Tyrrhenian Seas.

In May, the ship was redirected to the Sea of Crete as tensions escalated in the Middle East. There, America joined up with the carrier Saratoga and her destroyers. During this time, the carrier conducted normal training operations off the of Crete and held two major underway replenishment operations. The US deployments in the region soon attracted observers. A Soviet destroyer had maneuvered nearby in the morning of 2 June. Armed with surface-to-air missiles, the Russian ship constantly cut in and out of the carrier's formation. After being warned off by the American commander, the Soviet destroyer left America. Other Soviet ships arrived to shadow the carrier and her escorting destroyers for days.

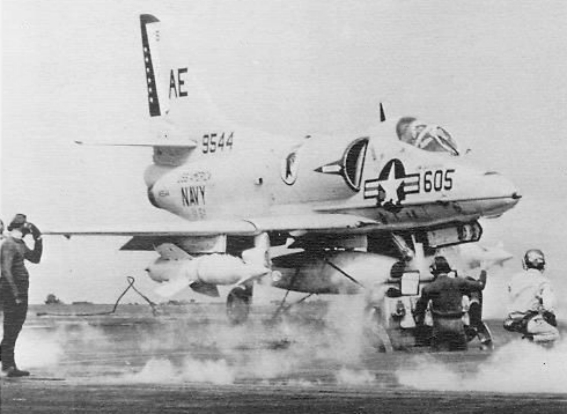
An A-4C Skyhawk of VA-64, armed with a pair of Bullpup missiles, ready to launch from America to support USS Liberty after she was attacked by Israeli forces.

In June 1967, the Six-Day War began between Israel and an alliance of Arab nations. On 7 June, the destroyer Lloyd Thomas, in company with America, obtained a sonar contact, which was classified as a "possible" submarine. Lloyd Thomas and the guided missile destroyer Sampson were ordered to investigate the contact. Sampson obtained contact quickly and coordinated with Lloyd Thomas in tracking the possible submarine.

America launched one of her anti-submarine helicopters, a Sikorsky SH-3A Sea King of Helicopter Antisubmarine Squadron 9, and gained sonar contact. At midnight, the contact was reclassified as a "probable" submarine. At that time, no known or friendly submarines were reported to be in the area of the contact. The destroyers maintained good sonar contact through the night. At 05:30 on 8 June, a Lockheed SP-2H Neptune anti-submarine patrol plane of Patrol Squadron 7, coordinating with the destroyers and helicopters, obtained a magnetic anomaly detector (MAD) confirmation over the contact. The MAD equipment allows an ASW aircraft to confirm that a contact detected in the sea by other means is actually a very large metal object.

At about 14:00 local time on 8 June 1967, the technical research ship Liberty was attacked by Israeli torpedo boats and jet fighters, about 15 mi (24 km) north of the Sinai port of El Arish, in international waters. America deployed her aircraft to provide cover the damaged ship and airlift the wounded to America. There was some controversy over America's role in the conflict. The Arabs charged that the aircraft carrier was providing support for the Israelis, which the Americans denied.

America transited the Dardanelles on 21 June and arrived at Istanbul. America departed Istanbul on 26 June for five days of operations in the Aegean Sea. By 7 August, after a number of ceremonies, port visits, the ship commenced the turnover of her 6th Fleet materials to her relief, the attack carrier Franklin D. Roosevelt.

America moored at Norfolk on 20 September and entered the Norfolk Naval Shipyard on 6 October. She remained there into early January 1968. From 6–8 January, the ship steamed for three days of sea trials in the Virginia Capes operating area. After a four-day ammunition onload at anchorage X-ray in Hampton Bay and a brief stay at Norfolk, America departed for a month-long cruise to the Caribbean for the naval technical proficiency inspection (NTPI), refresher training with the Fleet Training Group, Guantánamo Bay, and type training in the Atlantic Fleet Weapons Range (AFWR) before she could proceed to the Jacksonville Operating area for carrier qualifications.

On 16 January 1968, America departed Norfolk, arriving at Guantánamo Bay for training for her upcoming combat deployment to the western Pacific Ocean (WestPac). On 1 February, America departed the Guantanamo area, bound for the AFWR. On 2 February, representatives from the AFWR came on board to brief America representatives and Carrier Air Wing 6 pilots on forthcoming operations. The training consisted of invaluable and highly successful exercises in environmental tracking, antimissile defense, airborne jamming against radars, emergency aircraft recovery, and simulated PT boat attacks. With this phase of her combat training completed, America departed the AFWR on 9 February for carrier qualifications in the Jacksonville operating area.

On 7 March, America again put to sea, back to the AFWR for further type training and exercise "Rugby Match". America flew off eight simulated air strikes on Vieques, Puerto Rico, while also performing a search and rescue exercise (SAREX) and other training that simulated conditions found in Vietnam. Exercise "Rugby Match", a major Atlantic Fleet exercise involving approximately eighty ships was held in the AFWR from 7–29 March. America and Commander, CarDiv 2 (as commander, Task Group 26.1 (TG 26.1)), participated from the 18th to the 20th.

As the "Blue" Force attack carrier, America and her air wing pilots provided close air support (CAS), photo reconnaissance and combat air patrol (CAP) sorties for Task Force 22 (TF 22), the "Blue" amphibious landing force, during a landing on the island of Vieques. Prior to America's main participation during this period, CVW-6 flew an aerial mining mission in the amphibious operating area on the 15th. D-Day was 19 March. On return from their missions as CAS and CAP, several aircraft tested the anti-aircraft defenses of the task force by flying raids against America.

=== Bound for Vietnam ===
On 10 April 1968, America stood out of Hampton Roads, bound for "Yankee Station", off the coast of Vietnam. The next day, the ship's complement of men and machines was brought up to full strength as America recovered the remainder of CVW-6's aircraft off the coast of the Carolinas. En route, she conducted one last major training exercise. Rio de Janeiro, Brazil, was the next stop en route to southeast Asia, America's first to that city and continent. Now with her course set almost due east, America sailed through waters she had never traveled before. Across the southern Atlantic, around the Cape of Good Hope, past Madagascar and to Subic Bay, Philippine Islands. From Subic, the ship sailed northwest through the South China Sea towards "Yankee Station". En route, on 26 May, the ship participated in exercise "Newboy" and the next day held carrier qualifications. At 10:00, 30 May, she arrived at "Yankee Station, and at 06:30 the next morning the first aircraft since commissioning to leave her deck in anger was launched against the enemy."

During four line periods, consisting of 112 days on "Yankee Station", America's aircraft pounded at roads and waterways, trucks and waterborne logistics craft (WBLCS), hammered at petroleum storage areas and truck parks and destroyed bridges and cave storage areas in the attempt to impede the flow of men and war materials to the south. On 10 July 1968, Lt. Roy Cash, Jr. (pilot) and Lt. j.g. Joseph E. Kain, Jr. (radar intercept officer), in an F-4J Phantom from VF-33 downed a MiG-21 'Fishbed', 17 mi (27 km) northwest of Vinh, North Vietnam, for the ship's first MiG kill in the Vietnam War. America and her embarked air wing, CVW-6, would later be awarded the Navy Unit Commendation for their work during that time.

Between line periods, America visited Hong Kong, Yokosuka and Subic Bay. With America's mission on "Yankee Station" nearing completion, she launched the last of her attack aircraft at 10:30 on 29 October. The next day, she set sail for Subic Bay and the offload of various "Yankee Station" assets. In addition, a heavy attack squadron, VAH-10, and an electronic countermeasures squadron, VA-130, departed the ship on 3 November as they began a transpacific movement of their entire detachments to Alameda, and 144 aviators along with several members of the ship's company departed for the United States on the "Magic Carpet" flight.

The days the ship spent en route to Australia, New Zealand, Brazil, and Norfolk were, of necessity, more relaxed than those of her six months of combat. Nine hundred ninety-three "Pollywogs" were initiated into the realm of Neptunus Rex on the morning of 7 November as the ship again crossed the Equator. On 9 November, a flight deck "cookout" was sponsored by the supply department as the entire crew enjoyed char-broiled steaks and basked in the equatorial sun. After mooring at 13:30 on 16 December in Norfolk, her "round-the-world" cruise completed, post-deployment and holiday leave began, continuing through the first day of the year 1969.

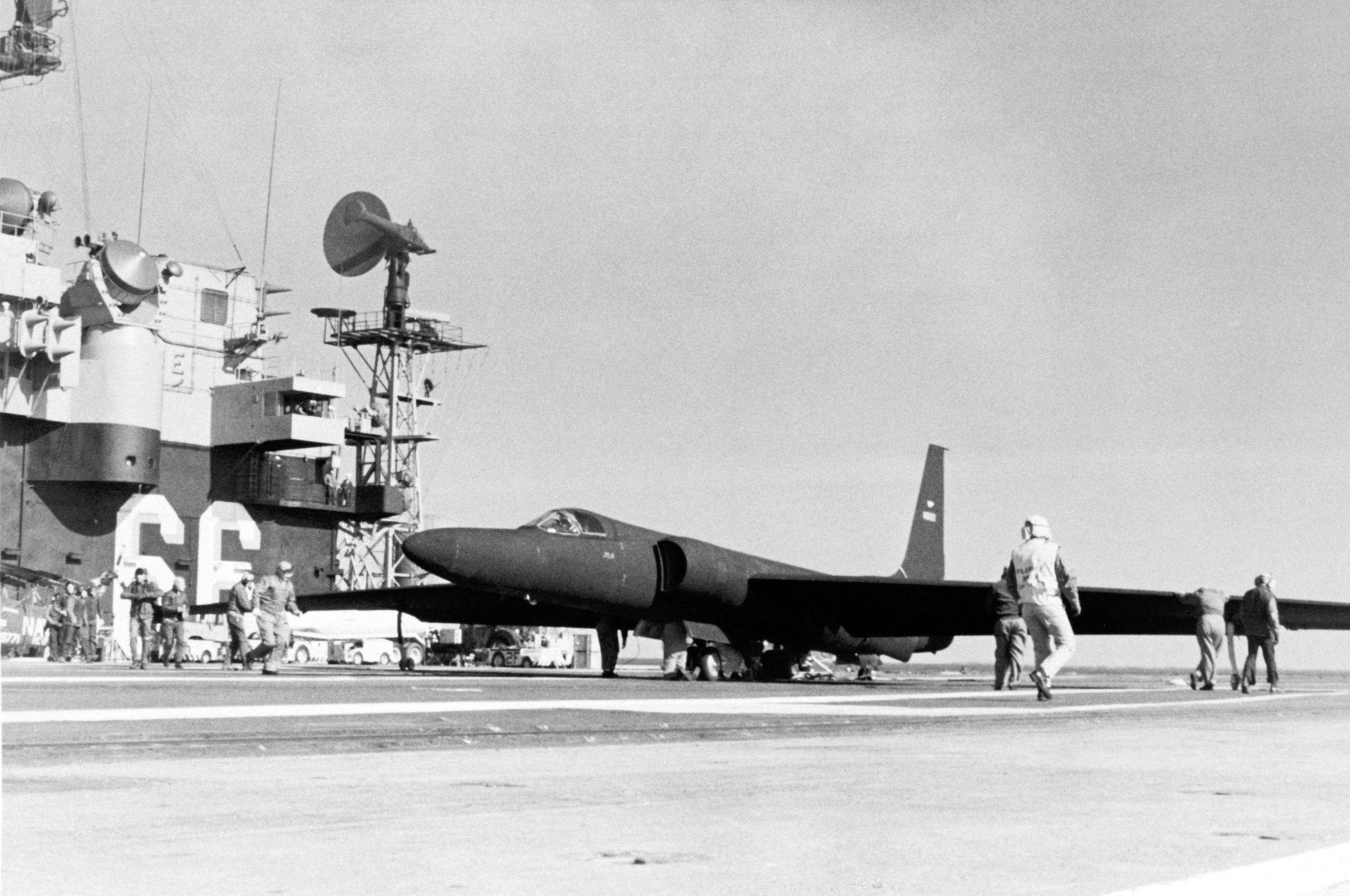
U-2 testing on America

On 8 January 1969, she headed for the Jacksonville operating area where she served as the platform for carrier qualifications. On 24 January, America arrived at the Norfolk Naval Shipyard to begin a nine-month overhaul. Upon completion of the overhaul, the carrier conducted post-repair trials and operated locally off the Virginia Capes. During one period of local operations, between 21 and 23 November 1969, America took part in carrier suitability tests for the Lockheed U-2R reconnaissance plane.

On 5 January 1970, the carrier departed the Norfolk area to commence a nine-week cruise in the Guantánamo Bay operating area. From 15 to 21 February, America participated in Operation "SPRINGBOARD 70", the annual series of training exercises conducted in the Caribbean. The program was established to take advantage of good weather and the extensive modern training facilities, including targets of all kinds, which are available in order to achieve maximum training during the period. This exercise included submarine operations, air operations, and participation by the Marine Corps. At the completion of this testing and training, America departed the Guantanamo area to arrive at the Jacksonville area on 1 March in order to conduct carrier qualification landings with the various squadrons stationed in and around the Jacksonville/Cecil Field area.

America arrived in Norfolk on 8 March and remained there for approximately one month making last minute preparations for an eight-month deployment.

=== Second Vietnam War deployment ===
On 10 April 1970, with CVW-9 on board, America left Norfolk and paused briefly in the Caribbean for an operational readiness inspection before proceeding on a voyage that took her across the equator to Rio de Janeiro, round the Cape of Good Hope, across the Indian Ocean, into the Pacific Ocean and finally to Subic Bay in the Philippines.

On 26 May, America began its first day of special operations in the Gulf of Tonkin, when Cmdr. Fred M. Backman, commanding officer of VA-165, and his bombardier/navigator, Lt. Cmdr. Jack Hawley, in a Grumman A-6C Intruder flew the ship's first combat sortie of the 1970 WestPac cruise. On the same day, the Navy's newest light attack aircraft, the A-7E Corsair II received its first taste of combat. At 12:01, Lt. (j.g.) Dave Lichterman, of VA-146, was catapulted from the deck in the first A-7E ever to be launched in combat. He and his flight leader, Cmdr. Wayne L. Stephens, the squadron's commanding officer, subsequently delivered their ordnance with devastating accuracy using the A-7E's digital weapons computer. Shortly after 13:00, Cmdr R. N. Livingston, skipper of the "Argonauts" of VA-147, and Lt Cmdr. Tom Gravely rolled in on an enemy supply route to deliver the first bombs in combat in an A-7E, reportedly "all on target".

For five line periods, consisting of 100 days on "Yankee Station", America's aircraft pounded at roads and waterways, trucks and waterborne logistic craft (WBLC), hammered at petroleum storage areas and truck parks in an attempt to impede the flow of men and war materials to the south.

On 20 August, at Manila, Vice Admiral Frederic A. Bardshar, Commander, Attack Carrier Striking Force, 7th Fleet, hosted the President of the Philippines, Ferdinand E. Marcos, on board America. Marcos was given a 21-gun salute as he and his wife Imelda Marcos arrived on board from their presidential yacht to visit the ship. Accompanied by U.S. ambassador Henry A. Byroade and his wife, they were greeted by Vice Admiral Bardshar and America's commanding officer, Capt. Thomas B. Hayward and were subsequently escorted to the ship's hangar deck where the carrier division band and the ship's marine detachment rendered honors. Following their arrival, the visiting party dined with Vice Admiral Bardshar and Capt. Hayward, and were later given a brief tour of the ship.

On 17 September, America completed her fourth line period and headed for special operations off the coast of Korea and subsequently, the Sea of Japan. On 23 September, the carrier entered the Tsushima Straits, remained in the Sea of Japan for approximately five days and exited on 27 September through the Tsugaru Strait.

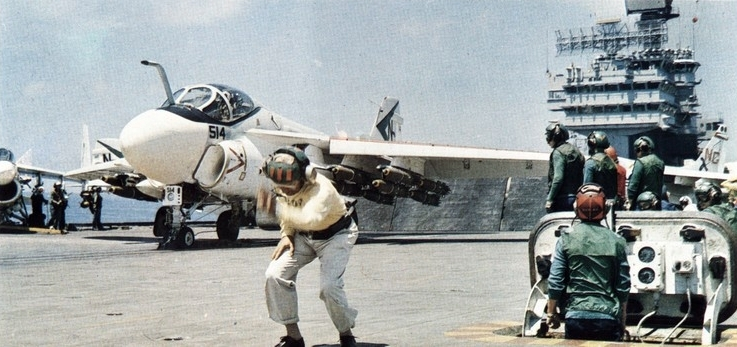
A A-6C Intruder of VA-165 on the catapult aboard America during her 1970 Vietnam deployment

During this period, America and CVW-9 engaged in three exercises: "Blue Sky", with elements of the Republic of China Air Force; "Commando Tiger", conducted in the Sea of Japan, involving air units of the Republic of Korea Air Force (ROKAF); and, after exiting the Tsugara Straits, "Autumn Flower", air defense exercises with the Japanese Air Self Defense Force (JASDF) and the United States Fifth Air Force.

On 7 November, America completed her fifth line period and departed for her last visit to Subic Bay. Through five line periods, the carrier had flown off 10,600 sorties (7,615 combat plus combat support), 2,626 actual combat sorties, completed 10,804 carrier landings, expended 11,190 tons of ordnance, moved 425,996 lb (193,229 kg) of cargo, handled 6,890 packages and transferred 469,027 lb (212,747 kg) of mail. She had accomplished this without a single combat loss and only one major landing accident with fortunately, no fatalities.

The day before the carrier arrived at Sydney, Australia, for a three-day rest and recreation visit, United States ambassador to Australia and his wife, the Honorable and Mrs. Walter L. Rice, flew on board to accompany the ship into Sydney.

America celebrated two Thanksgivings. At exactly 23:29 on 26 November, America crossed the International Date Line. Moments later it became Thanksgiving Day again.

After rounding Cape Horn on 5 December 1970, America headed north, stopped briefly at Rio de Janeiro for fuel, and arrived in Norfolk, on 21 December. She remained there until 22 January 1971, when the ship entered the Norfolk Naval Shipyard for a three-month restricted availability. She departed the yard, on schedule, on 22 March. Over the ensuing weeks, the ship operated locally in the Virginia Capes operating areas. She then carried out exercises in Puerto Rican waters, with United States Navy as well as Royal Navy warships-including HMS Ark Royal, HMS Cleopatra, and HMS Bacchante.

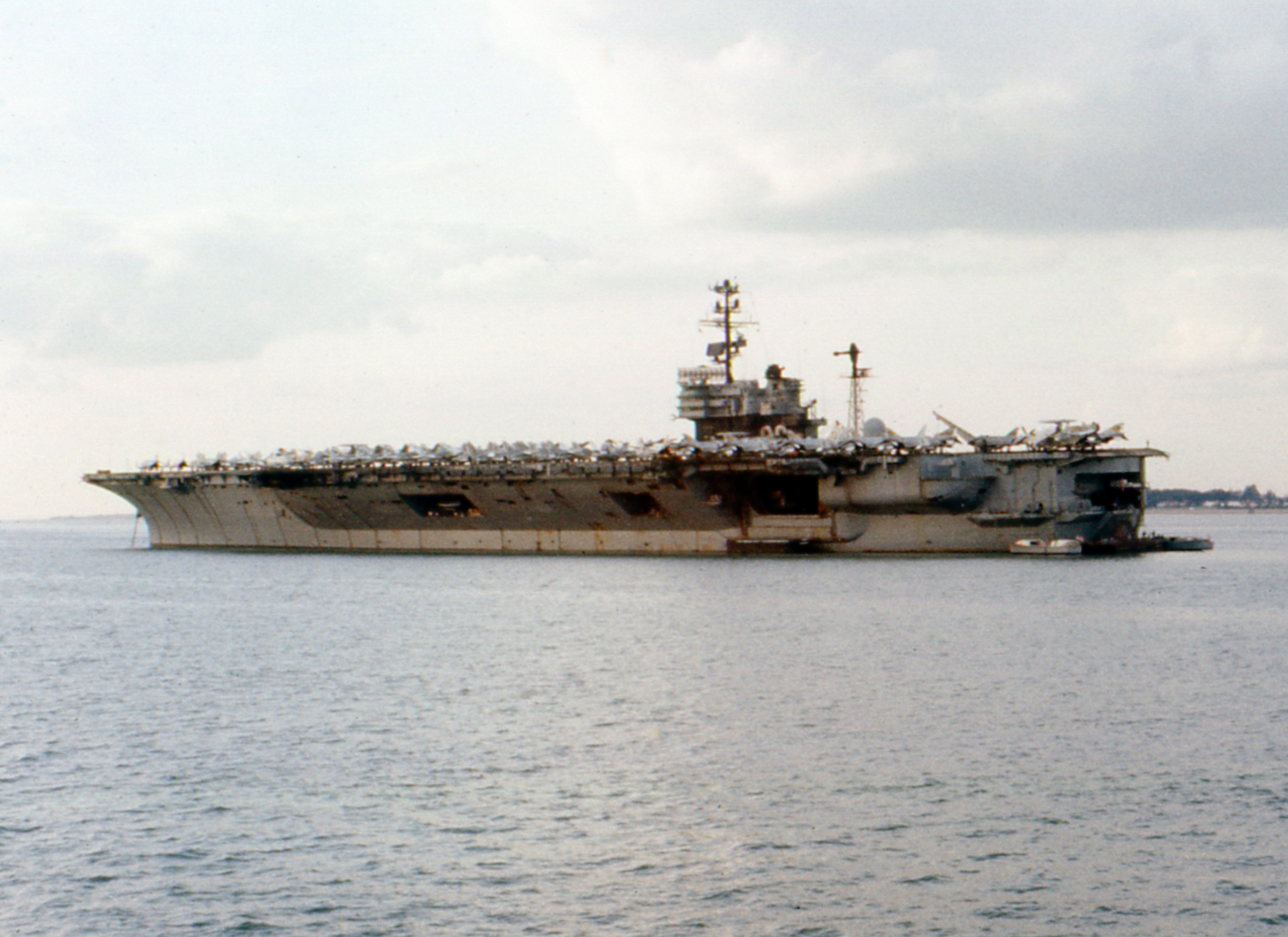
America moored in the Solent during a visit to the United Kingdom in December 1971

After a return to Norfolk, America stood out of Hampton Roads on 6 July 1971 for the Mediterranean. On 16 July 1971, America dropped anchor at Naval Station Rota, Spain in order to receive her turnover information from the ship she was relieving on station, Franklin D. Roosevelt. America then entered the Mediterranean for the third time since her commissioning. Between the time the ship left Rota, until she reached Naples, she participated in three major exercises.

Following a port call at Naples, America proceeded on a course toward Palma de Mallorca, Mallorca. While en route, she participated in "PHIBLEX 2–71", in which she covered a mock amphibious landing at Capoteulada, Sicily. After a port visit at Palma de Mallorca, America participated from 16 to 27 August in "National Week X", one of the largest exercises conducted in the Mediterranean. At the termination of the exercise, America proceeded to Corfu, Greece, her next liberty port. She then visited Athens shortly afterwards.

After conducting routine operations in the eastern Mediterranean and making a port call at Rhodes, Greece, the ship proceeded to the Aegean Sea to participate in Operation "Deep Furrow 71", America and CVW-8 providing close air support for almost the entire exercise.

Proceeding to Thessaloniki, Greece, for a port visit America then participated in "National Week XI", in the central Mediterranean. The carrier subsequently visited Naples before she steamed into the western Mediterranean to participate in exercises with British, Dutch, Italian, and French forces in exercise "Ile D'Or", completing her part in the evolutions by 19 November. America then conducted port visits to Cannes and Barcelona before proceeding to Rota. There, on 9 December, she was relieved on station by John F. Kennedy.

Arriving back at Norfolk on 16 December, America moored in Norfolk, for post-deployment stand down before unloading ammunition in preparation for availability at the Norfolk Naval Shipyard. After the two-month overhaul, the carrier conducted sea trials. Soon afterwards America embarked on a program of training, accelerated due to the fact that the date of her deployment had been advanced one month, and participated in exercise "Exotic Dancer V." She returned to Norfolk, upon conclusion of the exercises.

=== Third deployment to Vietnam ===
On 2 June 1972, three days before America was to sail Admiral Elmo R. Zumwalt, the Chief of Naval Operations, visited the ship and explained the reason why her orders had been changed sending her to the Gulf of Tonkin instead of the Mediterranean. Sailing on 5 June, America crossed the equator on 12 June and held the usual initiation of "pollywogs" into the realm of Neptune.

Escorted by destroyers Davis and Dewey, and accompanied by the fleet oiler Waccamaw, America proceeded toward southeast Asia, and rounded the Cape of Good Hope on 21 June. Joining the 7th Fleet later in June, America relieved the attack carrier Coral Sea on station, and commenced combat operations on 12 July. A ruptured main feed pump, however, prompted an early return to Subic Bay on 25 July for repairs, the ship arriving in the Philippines during a time of natural devastation–floods and landslides.

The repair work was delayed for two weeks while needed parts were rushed to Subic Bay. America stood out on 9 August to return to the line, and soon resumed carrying out strike operations against communist targets in North Vietnam. On 6 October, bombs from her planes dropped the Thanh Hoa Bridge, a major objective since the bombing of the North had begun years before.

Completing her line period and stopping over briefly at Subic Bay, America steamed to Singapore, departing that port on 20 October to resume operations on "Yankee Station." Less than a month later, a fire broke out on board America, at 14:10 on 19 November 1972, in the number two catapult spaces. The ship went to general quarters as smoke began to fill the 03 level, and damage control parties soon had the blaze extinguished. Clean-up and repair work ensued, and despite not having the services of one of her catapults, America remained on the line and continued to meet her commitments.

After an extended line period of 43 days, America reached Subic Bay on 2 December, where the number two catapult was repaired, and departed the Philippines on 8 December to return to "Yankee Station". A week before Christmas, America learned that the breakdown of peace talks in Paris had led to a resumption of bombing of targets in North Vietnam. America swung into action, and the pace proved hectic until the Christmas cease-fire. "Christmas away from home is never good", America's historian wrote, "but the men of America made the best of it with homemade decorations." There were services to celebrate the season, "and carolers were noted strolling through the passageways ...."

America received five battle stars for her service in the Vietnam War.

=== Cessation of hostilities ===
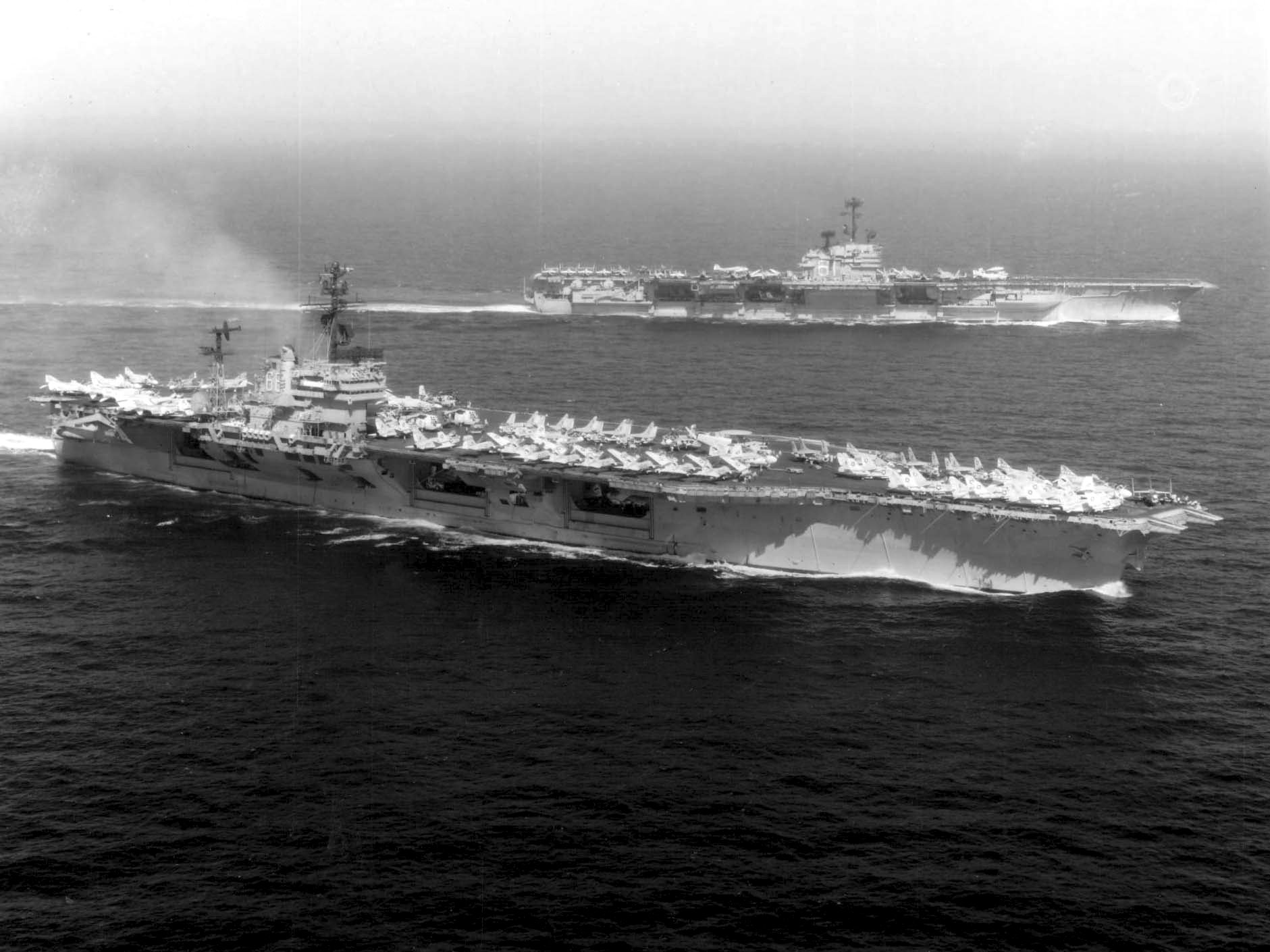
America (foreground) cruising with Ranger in the Gulf of Tonkin in 1973

On 28 December, the carrier anchored in Hong Kong harbor, and remained there until 4 January 1973, when she stood out for the Philippines and the period of rest and repairs at Subic Bay that would precede the ship's return to the line. All hands avidly followed the progress of the peace talks as America returned to "Yankee Station", and resumed operations. After two weeks on the line, the ship learned that peace had been secured and that an agreement was to be signed in Paris. At 08:00 on 28 January 1973, the Vietnam War—at least that stage of it—was at an end. Rumors swept the ship that her deployment would be shortened because of the cessation of hostilities, and hope ran high as the ship moored at Subic Bay on 3 February.

America did return to "Yankee Station" one last time, but her time on station proved short, as she returned to Subic Bay on 17 February and sailed thence for the United States three days later, on 20 February. The carrier arrived at Mayport Florida, disembarking men from CVW-8 and embarking the teen-aged sons of some of the ship's company officers and men, thus allowing them to ride the ship back to Norfolk with their fathers.

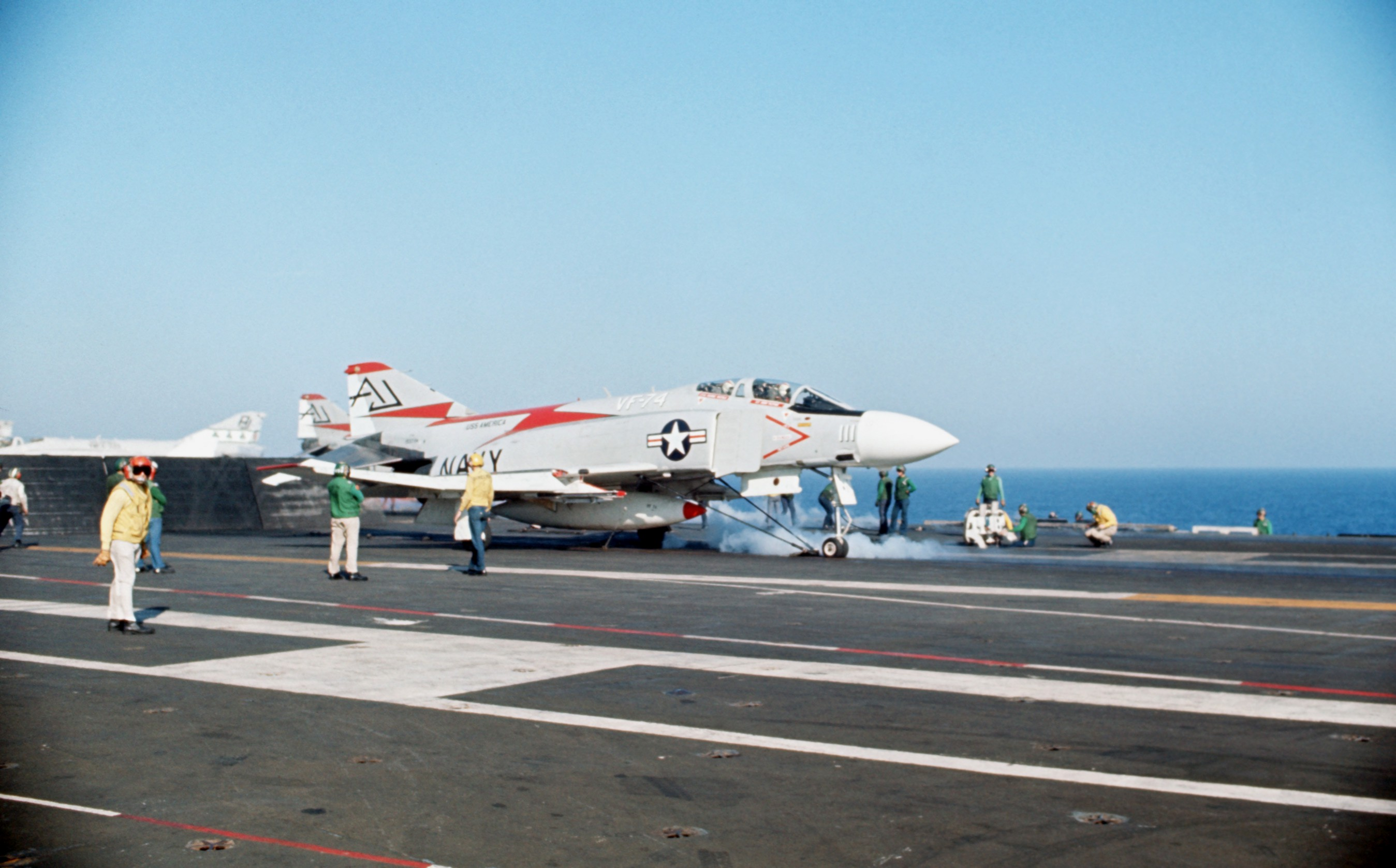
An F-4J for VF-74 preparing to launch from America during her 1972-73 Vietnam deployment

On 24 March, America arrived back at Norfolk, bringing to a close her sixth major deployment since commissioning. She immediately began preparations for a 30-day stand down and the restricted availability to follow at the Norfolk Naval Shipyard. She entered the yard on 11 May and emerged after that period of repairs and alterations on 10 August.

America conducted local operations out of Norfolk into October, and during this period the ship celebrated a significant milestone in the life of a carrier: she logged her 100,000th landing on 29 August 1973, when her COD aircraft (nicknamed "Miss America"), piloted by Lt. Cmdr. Lewis R. Newby and Lt. Cmdr. Ronnie B. Baker, landed on board. Cake-cuttings on the hangar deck and in the wardroom celebrated the occasion.

On 29 October, America cleared Hampton Roads for Jacksonville and a period of carrier qualifications. She was conducting routine training operations on 1 November when she went to the assistance of the crippled sailing schooner Harry W. Adams of Nova Scotia. The 147 ft (45 m) schooner, her engine disabled and without power for her pumps, was taking on water. Helicopters from America sped to the scene, and the ship provided rescue specialists and underwater demolition experts to assist in the effort. The ship's captain and his crew of nine all escaped serious injury, although the carrier's helicopters brought three of the crew on board for medical examinations and a warm meal. America stood by until the late afternoon, when the Coast Guard cutter PORT ROBERTS arrived to assist Harry W. Adams into port at Jacksonville.

After concluding her operations in the Jacksonville area America paid a port call at Ft. Lauderdale, Florida, from 4–8 November. She proceeded thence to sea for exercises of various kinds to hone the skills of the ship-air wing team and, following her operational readiness inspection off Mayport, proceeded back to Norfolk, on 21 November.

America then steamed south after the Thanksgiving holiday, for Atlantic Fleet readiness exercises, returned via Mayport to Norfolk on 13 December, and remained in her home port until sailing for the Mediterranean on 3 January 1974.

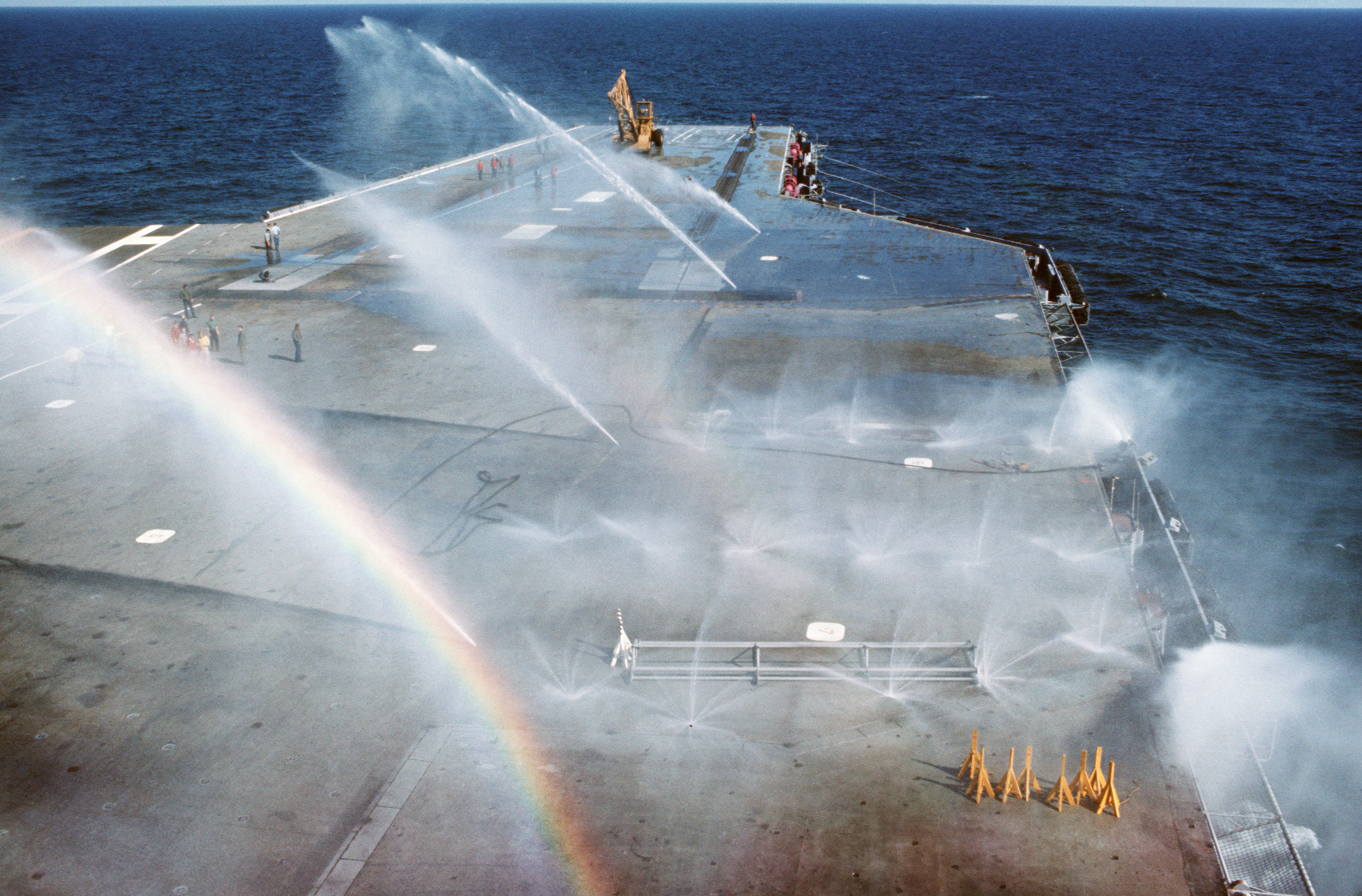
The flight deck washdown system is tested during America's 1976 Mediterranean cruise

Relieving Independence at Rota, Spain, on 11 January, she became the flagship for Rear Admiral Frederick C. Turner, Commander, TF 60. America commenced operations in the western Mediterranean that day and, over the next few weeks; divided her time between at-sea periods and port visits to Toulon, Barcelona, and Valencia. From 15 to 19 February, the carrier participated in exercise "National Week XVI", and upon the conclusion of that evolution anchored in Souda Bay, Crete. She proceeded thence for a port call at Athens.

Standing out of the waters of that Greek port on 1 March, America participated in "PHIBLEX 9–74", in which the ship's air wing, CVW, practiced supporting an amphibious landing. The carrier then operated north of Crete on exercises in early April, after which time she put into Athens on 9 April.

America then participated in NATO exercise, "Dawn Patrol", in which units of the navies of the United States, United Kingdom, Portugal, the Netherlands, France, Italy, and West Germany participated. During one phase of this exercise, the carrier's marine detachment embarked in El Paso and stormed ashore from that amphibious ship while America's planes provided close air support.

Upon the conclusion of Dawn Patrol, the carrier paid another visit to Athens, proceeding thence on 19 May for a four-day period of exercises, after which time she steamed to Istanbul, arriving there on 23 May.

Immediately following this port call, the ship returned to Athens and sailed thence for exercise "Shahbaz" to test the air defense capability of NATO ally Turkey early in June. America then anchored off the island of Rhodes, Greece, on 6 June for a four-day port visit, after which time she returned to Athens to embark Naval Academy midshipmen for their summer training cruise. America then participated in exercise "Flaming Lance", off the coast of Sardinia, during which time Leahy controlled over 1,000 intercepts by America's aircraft.

Making her last port call at Athens for the deployment, the carrier steamed to Souda Bay on 1 July, loading minesweeping equipment that had been used in Operation Nimbus Star, the clearance of the Suez Canal. America then proceeded to Corfu, and began the transit out of the eastern Mediterranean on 6 July, arriving at Palma de Mallorca, three days later.

America anchored off Rota on 15 July, for what was scheduled to have been an off-load of the equipment of Commander, TF 60, staff. Clashes between Greek and Turkish forces on Cyprus, however, prompted the Joint Chiefs of Staff to order America to remain at Rota until the arrival of her relief, Independence, on 28 July. As soon as that attack carrier entered the 6th Fleet operating area, America commenced her homeward voyage, ultimately reaching Norfolk, on 3 August.

A little over a month later, America sailed for the North Sea, to participate in a NATO exercise, "Northern Merger", departing Norfolk on 6 September. America joined with HMS Ark Royal in providing air support for a NATO task force and for an amphibious landing. Throughout the exercise Soviet surface units, as well as "Bear" and Tu-16 'Badger' aircraft, conducted surveillance missions over and near the NATO force.

Upon the conclusion of "Northern Merger", America steamed to Portsmouth, England, arriving there on 29 September to commence a five-day port visit. The carrier proceeded thence back to the United States, reaching Norfolk on 12 October, to commence preparations for a major overhaul at the Norfolk Naval Shipyard. Entering the yard on 27 November 1974, America remained there until 27 September 1975, when the ship got underway to conduct post-overhaul sea trials.

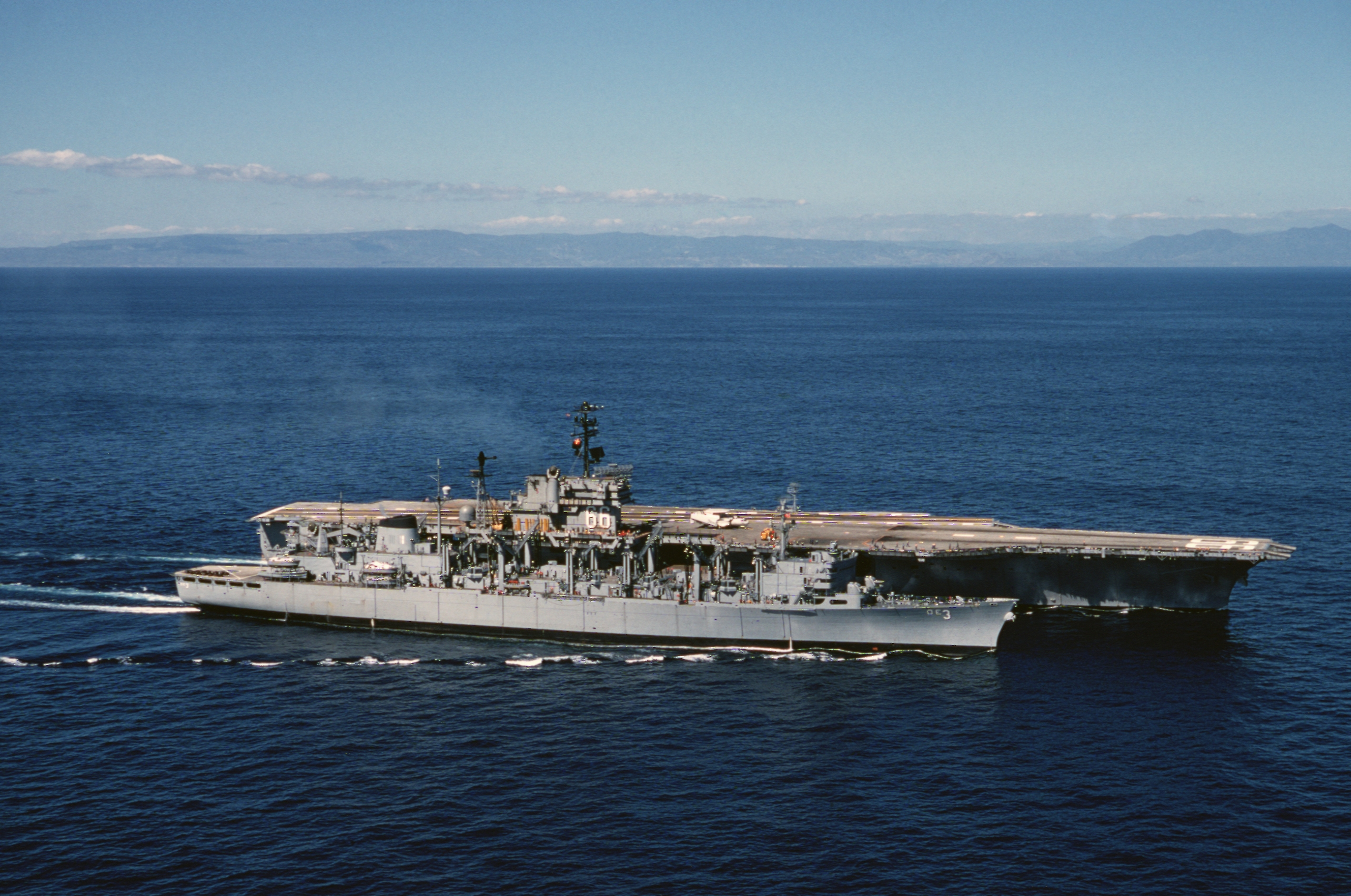
America conducts an UNREP with USS Seattle in the Mediterranean in 1976

America departed Norfolk Naval Shipyard on 16 October 1975 for local operations off the Virginia Capes and, after a few weeks in Norfolk, departed Hampton Roads for Cuban waters and refresher training.

While steaming north of Cuba and preparing for the operational readiness inspection that concludes refresher training, America picked up distress calls, immediately deploying helicopters and fixed-wing aircraft to search for a disabled motorized sailboat, Ruggentino. One of the carrier's helicopters located a boat in distress and guided a tug to the scene which took the disabled craft in tow. The boat, however, was the Content, so America and her aircraft resumed the search for Ruggentino. One of her planes soon located Ruggentino, and the ship dispatched a motor whaleboat to assist. America sailors soon had the boat pumped out and headed for port.

America completed her schedule of training in Cuban waters and then returned north, arriving back at Norfolk on 16 December 1975. Following the year-end stand down, the carrier resumed local operations out of Norfolk in January 1976 and, in March participated in exercise "Safe Pass '76" with ships of the Canadian, West German, Dutch and British navies. She ultimately sailed for the Mediterranean on 15 April 1976 with CVW-6 and Commander, Carrier Group 4 (CarGru 4), Rear Admiral James B. Linder, embarked.

=== Crisis in Lebanon ===
Soon after her arrival in the turnover port of Rota, America participated in a NATO exercise, "Open Gate", before entering the Mediterranean. Passing the Pillars of Hercules on 3 May, the ship entered into the eastern Mediterranean in support of Operation "Fluid Drive", a contingency operation for the evacuation of non-combatants from war-torn Lebanon. For the next three months, the carrier maintained a high state of readiness. In conjunction with "Fluid Drive", the ship and her air wing maintained continuous surveillance of the Soviet Mediterranean fleet, which at that point was at its largest since the Yom Kippur War of 1973.

On 24 May, America anchored in Rhodes, Greece, to commence her first liberty of the deployment-but violent anti-American demonstrations prevented the carrier's crew from going ashore, and the ship stood out two days later. America conducted a port visit to Taranto Italy, instead, but the deteriorating situation in the eastern Mediterranean required the ship to sail sooner than scheduled.

The assassination of the United States ambassador to Lebanon Francis E. Meloy, and Economic Counselor Robert O. Waring as they were on their way to visit Lebanese President Elias Sarkis on 16 June 1976 prompted the evacuation of Americans from that nation a week later, on the 20th. America remained on alert while landing craft from the dock landing ship Spiegel Grove transferred the evacuees from the beach to safety. Following the successful evacuation, the carrier proceeded westward for a few days of liberty in Italian ports celebrating the country's bicentennial Independence Day, 4 July 1976, at Bari, Italy.

Proceeding back into the eastern Mediterranean on 11 July to conduct a missile exercise north of Crete, the ship continued to maintain responsibility for "Fluid Drive." On 27 July, as more Americans were evacuated from Lebanon on board Portland, the carrier provided support. Relieved of her responsibilities in the eastern Mediterranean on 2 August, America reached Naples soon afterwards, and remained in port for two weeks. The carrier returned to sea on 18 August and participated in exercise "National Week XXI" with other 6th Fleet units.

Upon the termination of "National Week XXI", America proceeded to Palma, whence she proceeded to participate in "Poop Deck 76" with Spanish Air Force units and United States Air Force units based in Spain. Then, following visits to the Spanish ports of Barcelona and Málaga, America took part in the final exercise of her Mediterranean cruise, exercise "Display Determination". HMS Ark Royal teamed with America, and ships from the navies of Italy, Greece, Portugal, and Turkey participated as well. The American carrier conducted convoy escort duties, simulated close air support for amphibious operations, and simulated strikes against military targets. Upon conclusion of "Display Determination", the carrier proceeded to Rota, where she was relieved by Franklin D. Roosevelt. America ultimately reached Norfolk on 25 October 1976.

On 6 November, the carrier proceeded up the Elizabeth River to the Norfolk Naval Shipyard, where she remained into February 1977. America then operated locally out of Norfolk into the spring of 1977 until sailing for the Mayport, Florida, operating area on 3 May. Following her participation in exercise "Solid Shield 77", a joint service amphibious training exercise, the carrier returned to Norfolk on 24 May.

America sailed from Hampton Roads on 10 June 1977 for a five-week South Atlantic deployment as a unit of TG 20.4. Other ships in company included South Carolina, Claude V. Ricketts, Dupont, and Neosho. Following her return to Norfolk, America operated locally before she sailed to conduct operations in the Caribbean.

After returning to Norfolk on 27 August, America sailed for the Mediterranean on 29 September, with CVW-6 embarked, and reached Rota on 9 October. Departing that port on 14 October the carrier proceeded to the Tyrrhenian Sea, where she operated until 26 October. Following a port call at Brindisi, Italy, America began operations in the Ionian Sea on 7 November, and anchored at Souda Bay, Crete, two days later. She operated locally in these waters until 12 November, when she sailed for Kithira Island, Greece, anchoring there on the 19th.

Weighing anchor the following morning, America sailed for the Adriatic Sea, bound for Dubrovnik, Yugoslavia. Visiting this seaport from 22 to 26 November, the carrier transited the Adriatic for a port call at Trieste, staying there from 28 November to 3 December. Returning to operate in the waters of Souda Bay for more exercises, America subsequently departed Crete on 12 December for Palma, where she spent Christmas.

Departing Palma two days later, America proceeded through the Ligurian Sea to her next port of call, Genoa, which she reached on 30 December. She remained there until 8 January 1978, when she sailed to carry out antisubmarine exercises in the Tyrrhenian Sea, upon the conclusion of which she anchored in Golfo di Palma, Sicily. Operations in the western Mediterranean and again in the Tyrrhenian Sea rounded out most of January 1978, and the ship rested briefly at Catania, Italy, before getting underway for exercise "National Week" on 5 February.

She returned to the Tyrrhenian Sea and western Mediterranean for further exercises during March, and then visited Barcelona before she brought the deployment to a close with further exercises in the western Mediterranean. At Rota, she was relieved by Forrestal, and sailed for Norfolk, arriving home on 25 April 1978.

Following post-deployment stand down, America conducted carrier qualifications off the Virginia Capes, and then entered Norfolk Naval Shipyard for an availability. Upon the conclusion of that period of repairs and alterations, the carrier conducted post-availability sea trials on 19–20 September 1978, and conducted carrier qualifications with CVW from 12 to 20 October. Tragedy marred the last day of operations, when a Lockheed S-3 Viking antisubmarine aircraft went over the side upon landing; hung on the safety nets momentarily, then plunged into the sea. Although the pilots, Lt. Cmdr. Ziolowski and Lt. (j.g.) Renshaw ejected clear of the plane, they were not recovered.

America subsequently conducted refresher training out of Guantánamo Bay early in November, before she called at Ft. Lauderdale on 10 November to commence a four-day stay. Returning to Norfolk soon afterwards, the carrier remained in the Norfolk area, alternating periods of time in port with type-training and exercises off the Virginia Capes.

The carrier cleared Norfolk on 5 January 1979 for the Caribbean operating areas, and conducted type training there from 5–23 January after which time the ship visited St. Thomas, in the U.S. Virgin Islands, from 24 to 29 January. America then resumed type training in the waters of the Caribbean and West Indies, concluding those evolutions on 12 February to return to Norfolk.

After bringing CVW-11 on board off the Virginia Capes on 8 and 9 March, America spent the next two days moored in Norfolk making final preparations for her departure for the Mediterranean. The carrier sailed on 13 March. Two days later, on 15 March, America conducted a "BEAREX" with a Lockheed P-3 Orion from Bermuda simulating a Russian "Bear" reconnaissance aircraft. Such practice proved timely, for the following day, A-7 and Grumman F-14 Tomcat aircraft from America intercepted a pair of the long-range "Bear D" planes that were en route to Cuba from their bases in the Soviet Union. The "Bears" never came within visual range of the carrier's battle group.

Reaching Rota on 24 March, America relieved Saratoga and commenced operations in the western Mediterranean on 29 March. During this deployment, the ship visited a variety of ports, starting with Naples, Taranto, and Catania. Moving into the Adriatic, the carrier stopped at Split, Croatia, before moving north to Venice and Trieste. In the eastern Mediterranean, America called at Alexandria, Egypt, at Souda Bay, Crete. Returning west, she visited Palma and Barcelona in Spain, Marseille on the coast of France, Genoa in northern Italy and Valencia in Spain before heading for Rota. She completed turnover proceedings at Rota on 10–11 September 1979, and got underway immediately to commence the homeward voyage.

Highlighting this period were numerous multilateral and unilateral exercises, as in previous Mediterranean deployments. During one phase of "National Week XXVII", America and her consorts took part in an open sea exercise that took them into the waters of the Gulf of Sidra (Sirte) – claimed by Libya as territorial waters since 11 October 1973. The Libyan government serving notice that any ship or aircraft operating south of the 32-30 north latitude would be violating its territory, America's battle group maintained an alert, in view of the proximity of Libyan airfields and Soviet-made aircraft operating therefrom. Departing Augusta Bay, Sicily, on 26 July, the task group arrived in its exercise area on the 28th. As planes from CVW-11 maintained nearly continuous fighter cover, the ships conducted their exercise unhindered.

Ultimately departing Rota on 12 September 1979 to conduct a blue water turnover with Nimitz, America encountered her second pair of "Bears". F-14 Tomcats of VF-213 intercepted the two, however, and caused them to turn away to the north, having never sighted a single ship in the carrier's battle group. Reaching Norfolk on 22 September, America stood down after her 6th Fleet deployment.

The carrier departed Norfolk again on 15 October for Mayport, and conducted local operations off the coast of Florida before moving into the Gulf of Mexico to conduct carrier qualifications. Returning north upon completion of those evolutions, America put to sea on 30 October for more carrier qualifications-these, however, involved the first arrested carrier landings of the new McDonnell-Douglas F/A-18 Hornet. This aircraft underwent rigorous testing over the days which followed, before America returned to Norfolk on 3 November.

Entering the Norfolk Naval Shipyard on 6 November 1979, America underwent repairs and alterations for much of 1980 commencing her post-repair trials on 23 September 1980. Among the work performed during the availability was the installation of the NATO "Sea Sparrow" missile and close-in weapon systems such as the multi-barreled "Phalanx" machine gun.

The ship carried out a second period of post-repair trials from 16 to 21 October, after which time she returned to Norfolk whence she conducted sea trials from 27 to 29 October. Subsequently, conducting refresher training out of Guantánamo Bay, America returned to the Virginia Capes operating area to conduct carrier qualifications in early December. She spent the remainder of the year 1980, undergoing upkeep at Norfolk.

America operated locally in the Virginia Capes area into January 1981 and, during these operations on 14 January 1981, brought on board a Grumman C-1A "Trader" COD aircraft piloted by Ens. Brenda Robinson, USNR. Ens. Robinson became the first black female naval aviator to be carrier qualified. The ship later conducted carrier qualifications for CVW-11.

On 29 January 1981, as America was returning to Norfolk, she received a message from a Greek motor vessel, Aikaterini, in distress. America, diverted to the scene to render assistance until the Coast Guard could arrive, sent helicopters from her embarked HS-12 with damage control equipment, members of the ship's fire department, and damage control assistance to the stricken ship.

Returning to Norfolk on 2 February, America proceeded thence for carrier qualifications off the Virginia Capes, and thence to the Caribbean for type training. Returning to Norfolk on 19 March, America – in company with her consorts California and Preble subsequently sailed for the Mediterranean on 14 April 1981, destined, ultimately, for the Indian Ocean.

Reaching Palma on 23 April, America then participated in NATO exercise "Daily Double", with the amphibious assault ship Nassau, as well as with Greek and Italian Navy units on the 28th before she steamed to Port Said, Egypt.

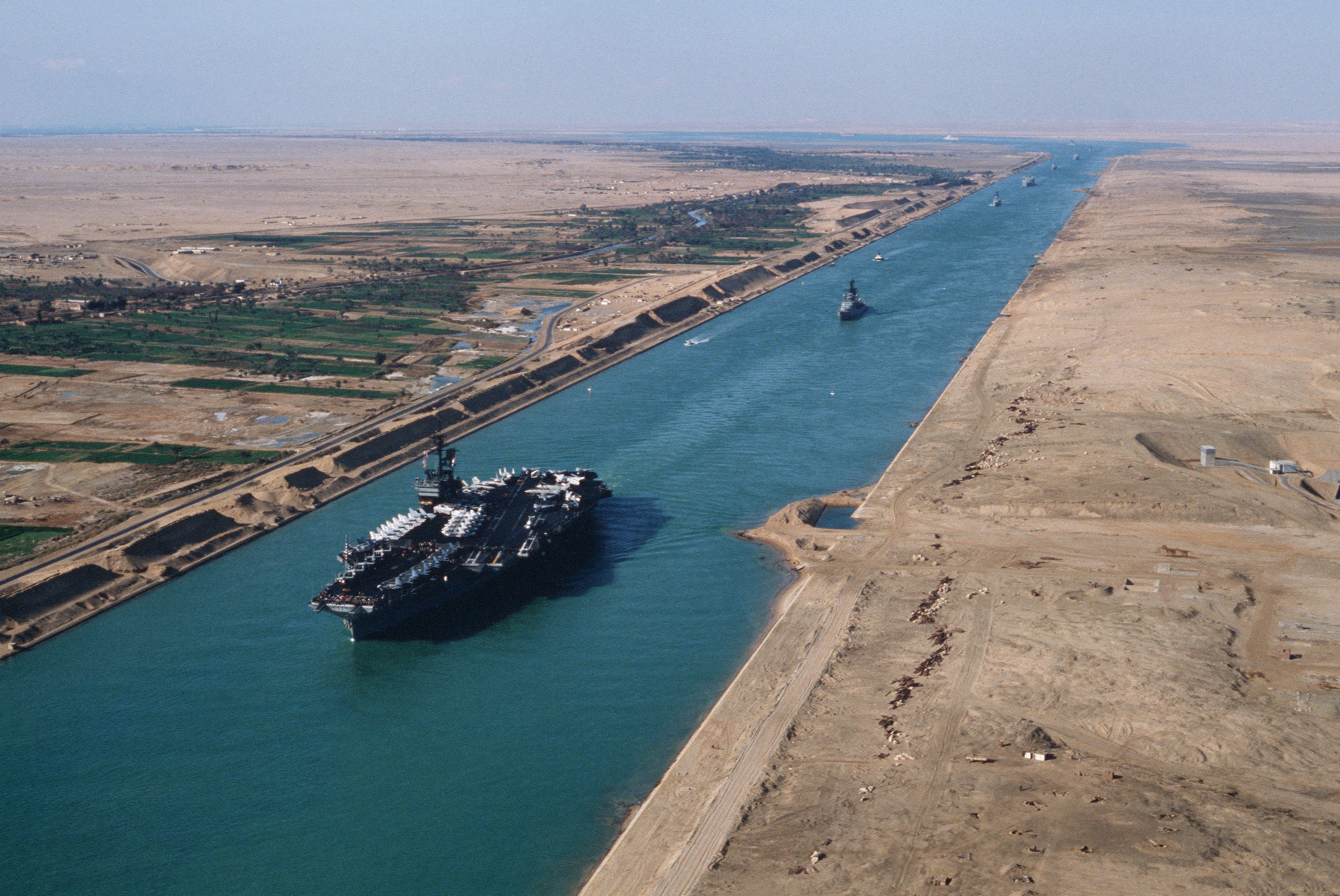
America transiting the Suez canal, 1981.

Originally scheduled to have commenced her transit of the Suez Canal on 5 May, the tense situation in Lebanon prompted a 24-hour "hold" on the evolution. Given the go-ahead soon after, America made the 104.5 mi (168.2 km) transit on 6 May, in ten hours – the first United States Navy carrier to steam through the Suez Canal since Intrepid had made the passage shortly before the Arab-Israeli "Six-Day War" of 1967. It was also the first "super-carrier" to transit the canal since it had been modified to permit passage of supertankers.

America operated in the Indian Ocean, on "Gonzo" Station, for the first time from 12 May – 3 June, after which time she visited Singapore. On 18 June, the carrier departed that port for her second stint on "Gonzo Station". This deployment was to last 35 days. America and her embarked air wing provided a vital U.S. presence in the North Arabian Sea and ensured freedom of the seas for all nations operating ships through the Strait of Hormuz and into the Persian Gulf. These operations were conducted in a routine manner through three line periods (except for the loss of the ship's anchor while mooring off of Masirah Island).

On 15 July, America was requested to provide search and rescue (SAR) aircraft to assist in locating a merchant ship in distress in the northern Arabian Sea. The Greek merchantman Irene Sincerity was reportedly afire. America's planes located the ship and California rescued the 39 crewmen and disembarked them in good condition in Karachi, Pakistan.

Upon completion of her second northern Arabian Sea line period on 4 August, America shaped a course for Australian waters conducting a "Weapons Week" exercise in the vicinity of Diego Garcia. During "Weapons Week", a Lockheed P-3 "Orion" of Patrol Squadron (VP) 50 requested two F-14 Tomcats from America, flying in the vicinity of Pierre Island, near Diego Garcia, to assist in contacting their ship for SAR assistance. California sped to the island and located a man stranded on Pierre Island who had been on a treasure-hunting expedition from Sri Lanka to Mauritius. The cruiser took the man to Diego Garcia.

Departing the Diego Garcia operating area on 15 August, America conducted a unique burial-at-sea on the 18th, when the remains of the late Lt. Stephen O. Musselman were consigned to the ocean. Musselman had been shot down on 10 September 1972 in an A-7 Corsair II from America, over North Vietnam, and his remains had been returned by the Vietnamese government on 8 July 1981. Lt. Musselman's widow requested that these remains be consigned to the last ship he had served in and buried thence.

America anchored in Gage Roads at Fremantle, Western Australia on 25 August, and remained there for six days, sailing for "Gonzo Station" on the 31st. During her third line period, the ship spent 34 days on station. On 23 September, a fire broke out in a steam trunk line that carries steam from the main engineering spaces to the flight deck catapult system, at about 17:45. Soon after America's fire party arrived on the scene to isolate the fire, smoke began filling the areas adjacent to the crew berthing areas, so Capt. James F. Dorsey, Jr., ordered general quarters sounded.

America's firefighters soon managed to quell the blaze, and the ship secured from battle stations at 23:16. The carrier resumed normal flight operations the next morning at sunrise, and remained on station until relieved by Coral Sea on 16 October. Two days later, while America steamed toward the Bab el Mandeb Strait, the ship went to general quarters, in view of threats issued by the People's Democratic Republic of Yemen. The ship passed without incident, and continued her journey through the Red Sea unhindered.

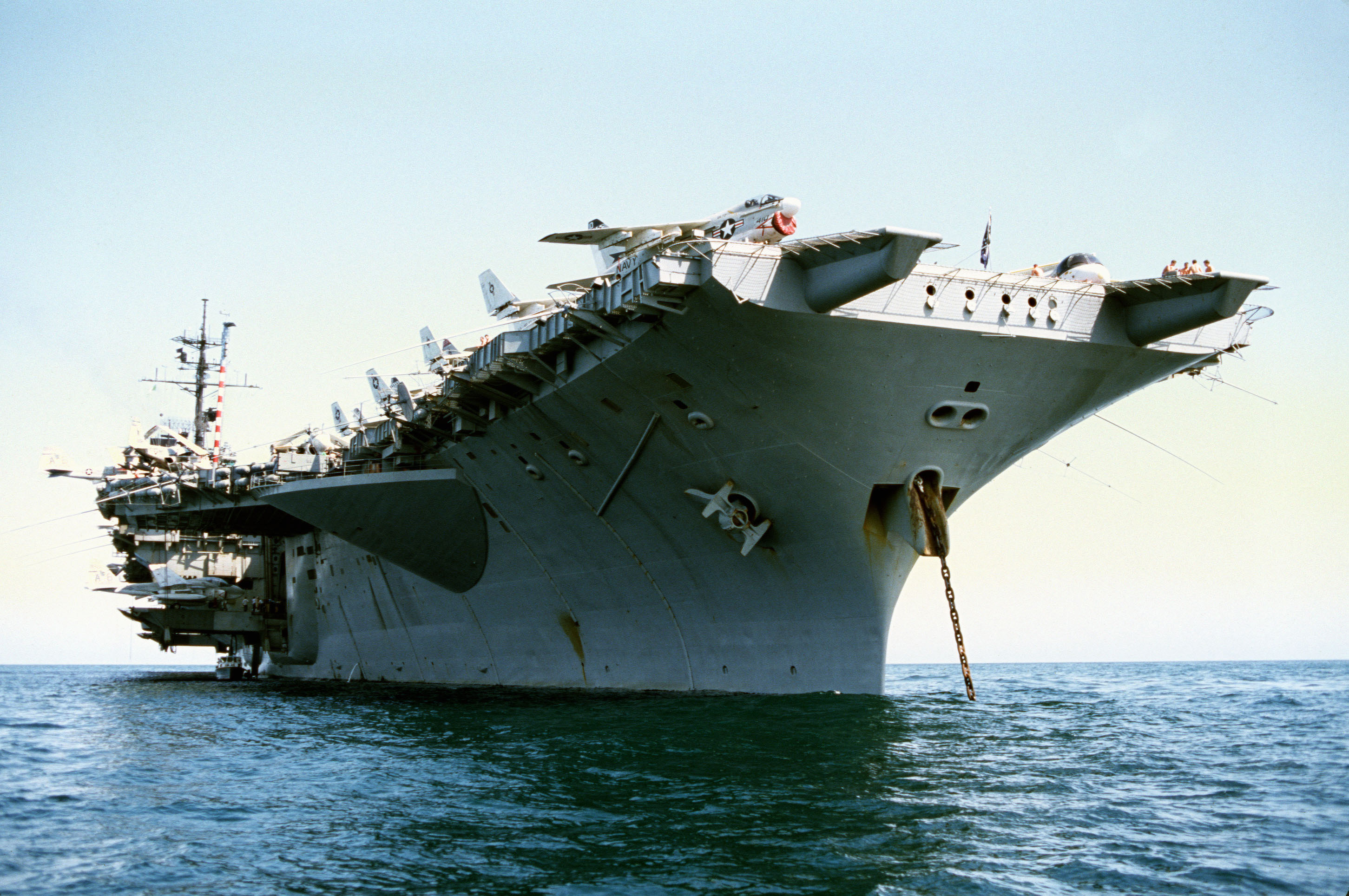
A waterline view of USS America, 1982.

On 21 October 1981, America commenced the northbound transit of the Suez Canal. This transit, unlike the comparatively light-hearted one of 6 May, proved more tense. As a result of the unsettled conditions in Egypt following 6 October 1981 assassination of President Anwar Sadat, the Egyptian government accorded America's passage through the Suez Canal the utmost security considerations. The Egyptian Navy provided a patrol vessel to escort the carrier, while an Egyptian Air Force helicopter conducted reconnaissance flight over both banks of the waterway. Egyptian Army units patrolled the adjacent canal roads. Additionally, liaison officers on board the carrier maintained constant touch with the security forces by radio.

Making the passage of the canal without incident, America continued on across the Mediterranean, reaching Palma on 25 October. After a three-day port call, the carrier conducted exercises with Spanish forces, and subsequently sailed for home on 1 November, departing the Mediterranean the following day. She arrived at Norfolk on 12 November.

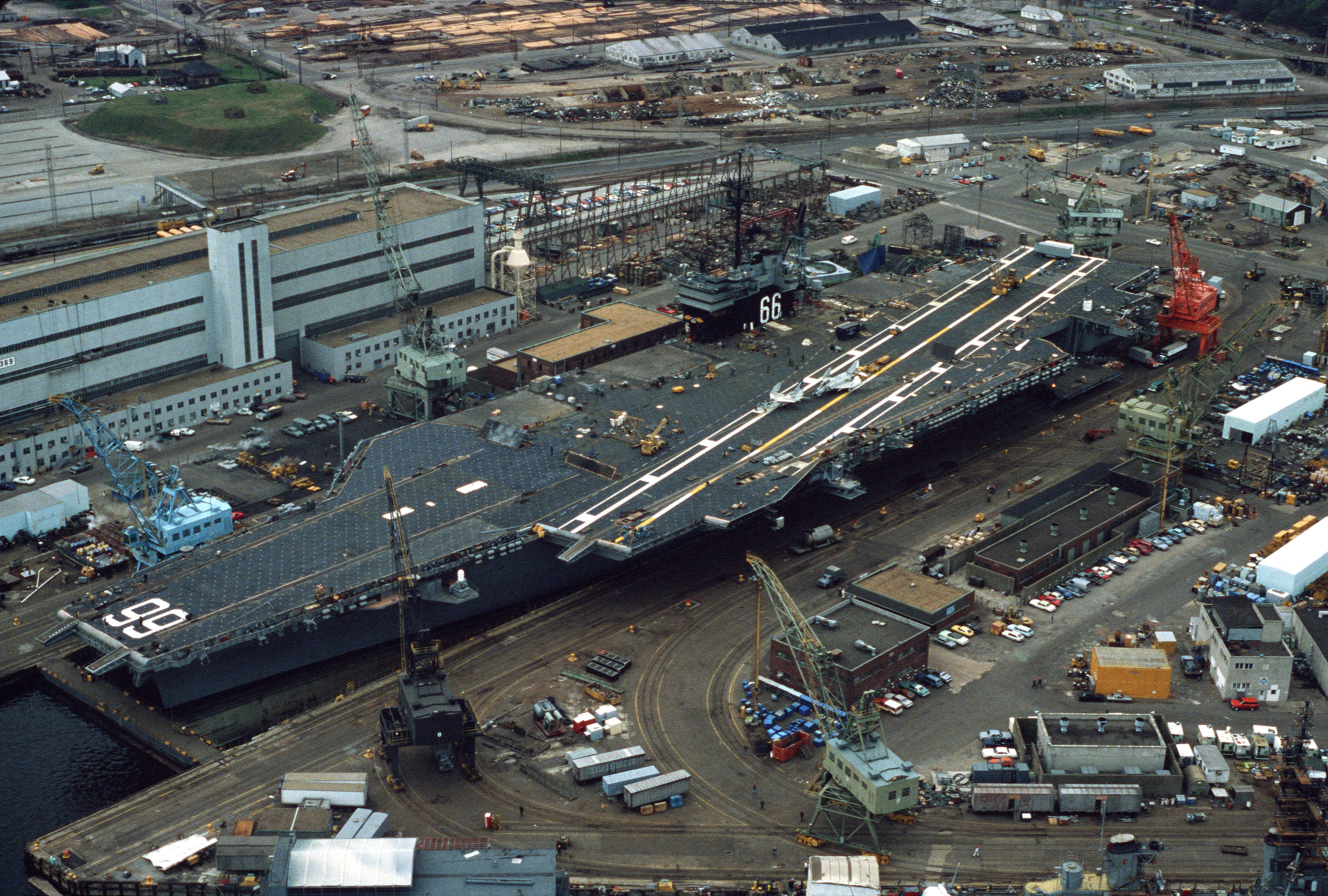
America in dry dock at Norfolk Naval Shipyard, 1982.

Following a short stand down, America conducted carrier qualifications in the Virginia Capes operating area, before she moored at the Norfolk Naval Shipyard on 14 December. Emerging from the naval shipyard on 20 April 1982, America operated locally off the Virginia Capes. Departing Norfolk on 10 May, the ship steamed to the Guantánamo Bay operating area and returning to her home port on 28 May.

Following further carrier qualifications off the Virginia Capes the carrier then steamed south to conduct type training in the West Indies, interspersing these evolutions with a port visit to St. Thomas. Returning to Norfolk on 8 July, America operated locally from 22 to 24 July, before she sailed on 22 August, with CVW-1 embarked, to participate in joint NATO exercises "United Effort" and "Northern Wedding 82".

America visited Edinburgh, Scotland, from 15 to 21 September and proceeded thence to Portsmouth, England, arriving there on 23 September. Sailing for the Mediterranean on 26 September, the carrier operated briefly with the 6th Fleet, participating in exercise "Display Determination" from 30 September – 8 October. She then sailed for the United States, and, following her operational readiness evaluation in the Caribbean operating areas, reached Mayport to disembark CVW-1. America returned to Norfolk on 4 November.

=== Returning to Lebanon ===
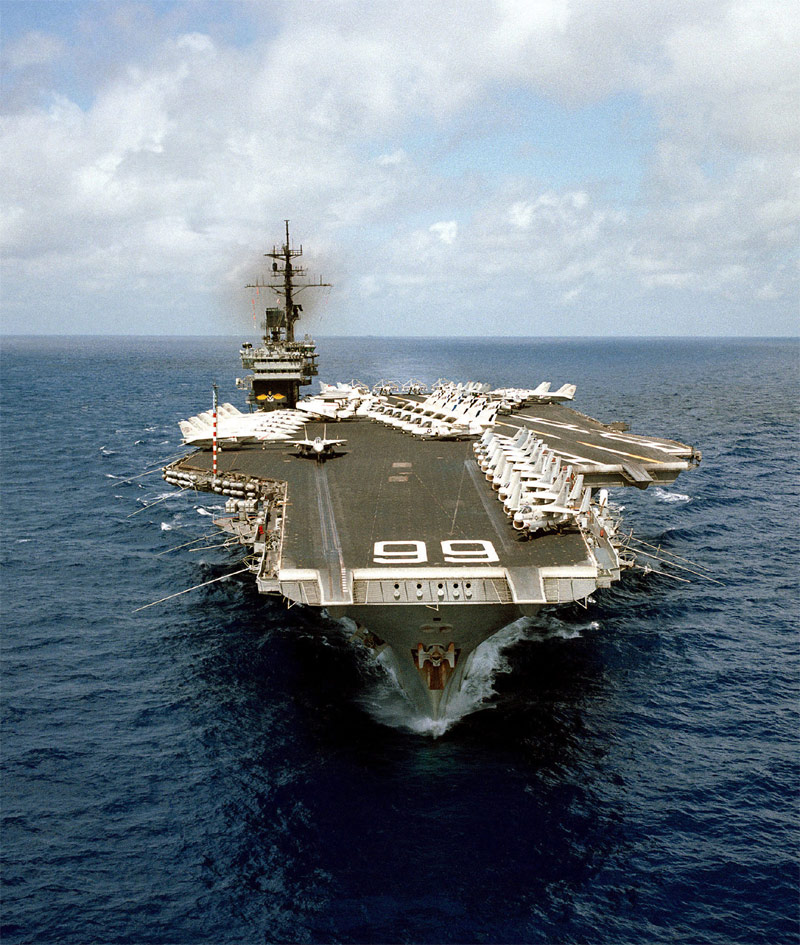
America underway in the Indian Ocean in 1983

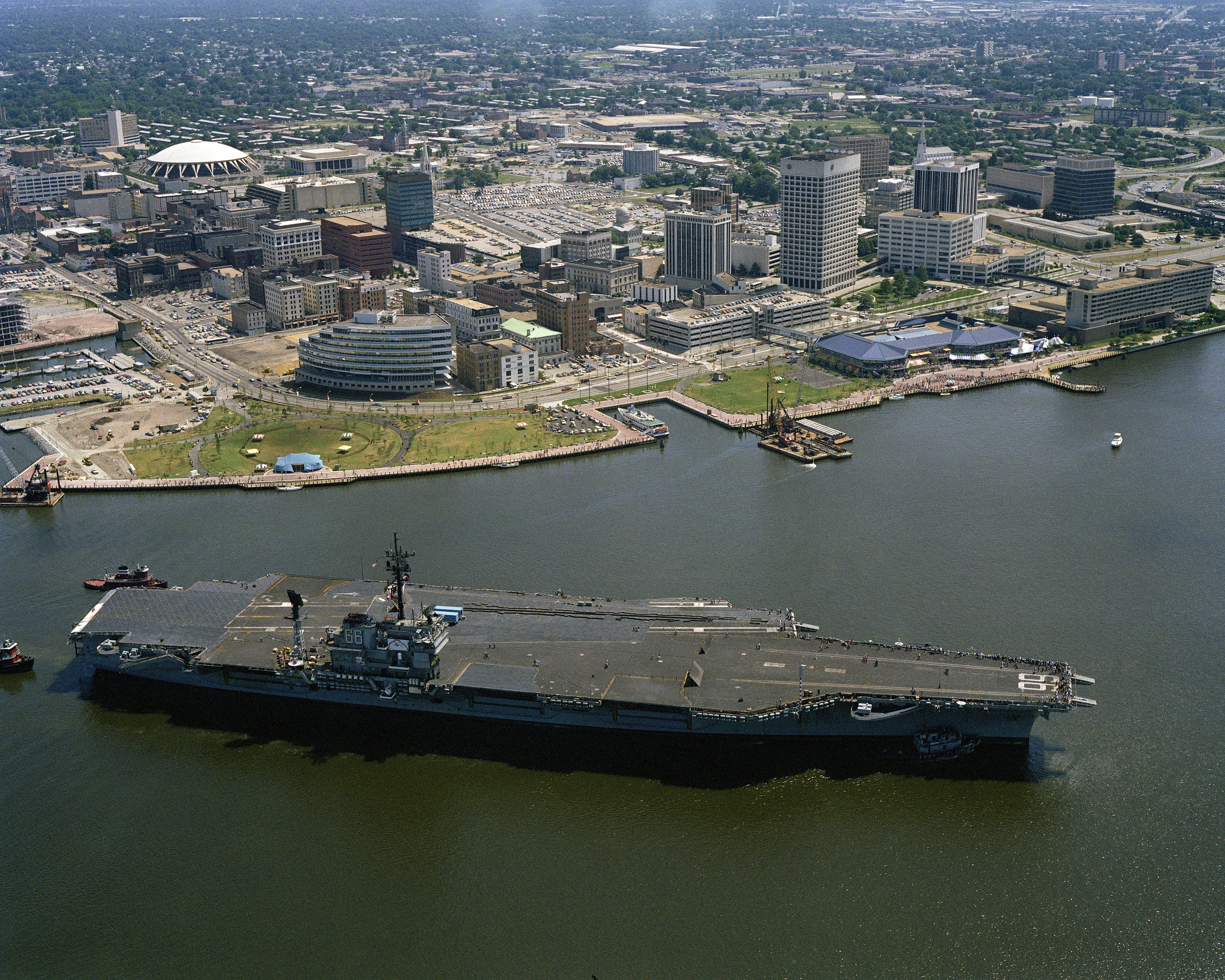
America in Norfolk, August 1983

America departed Norfolk on 8 December 1982, proceeded to the Virginia Capes operating area and embarked CVW-1, and set out across the Atlantic. Visiting Palma on 22 December America remained there through the Christmas holiday, weighing anchor on 28 December to sail for the Lebanese coast, where she was to take up duty in support of the Multinational Peacekeeping Force in strife-torn Lebanon. Relieving USS Nimitz on station on 2 January 1983, America spent the next 18 days off Lebanon, before Nimitz took over on 20 January. Steaming thence to Piraeus, Greece, America, along with Dale and Savannah, anchored there on 23 January for a five-day port visit to Athens.

Underway on 29 January, the carrier transited the Sea of Crete en route to an overnight anchorage at Port Said. Transiting the Suez Canal on 31 January, America reached the Red Sea the same day and reported for duty with the 7th Fleet on 4 February. On 9 February, the carrier and her accompanying battle group conducted exercise "Beacon Flash 83". Subsequently, on 28 February, America and her consorts conducted a "Weapons Week" exercise in the vicinity of Diego Garcia. Following those evolutions, the carrier visited Colombo, Sri Lanka, anchoring on 7 March. Weighing anchor on 12 March, America resumed operations in the Indian Ocean soon afterwards, culminating in "Beacon Flash 83-4", and a subsequent port visit to Masirah Island, Oman.

Steaming thence to Mombasa, Kenya, and a five-day port visit America departed that port for a week of intense flight operations, followed by participation in "Beacon Flash 85" on 19 April. Returning to anchor at Masirah Island again three days later, the carrier and her battle group operated in the northern Arabian Sea, en route to the Suez Canal. Transiting that waterway on 4 May, America headed for Souda Bay, reaching an anchorage there on 7 May. Five days later, the carrier got underway for Málaga, Spain, reaching her destination on 14 May for a nine-day port visit. The ship subsequently departed Málaga on 23 May, and reached Norfolk on 2 June. America then entered the Norfolk Naval Shipyard on 8 July. For four months, the ship underwent a period of repairs and alterations, emerging from the yard on 28 October. She then operated locally off the Virginia Capes with CVW-1 embarked, before she proceeded thence to Mayport, and, ultimately, to Puerto Rican waters for refresher training. Subsequently, visiting Nassau, in the Bahamas, for a five-day port visit, America returned to the East Coast of the United States, reaching Mayport on 8 December. She then conducted carrier qualifications for both East and West Coast squadrons en route to her home port reaching Norfolk on 14 December.

The carrier operated locally from Norfolk into February 1984 alternating periods of upkeep in port with carrier qualifications and exercises. She then conducted two periods of type training (6–20 February and 25 March – 8 April), interspersing these with an in-port period at Ft. Lauderdale from 21 to 24 February and then calling at St. Thomas upon conclusion of the second period of training. Returning to Norfolk on 22 March, America spent the next month preparing for her next deployment, and got underway to participate in exercise "Ocean Venture" on 24 April. Visiting Caracas, Venezuela, upon conclusion of that evolution, America departed on 9 May for the Mediterranean.

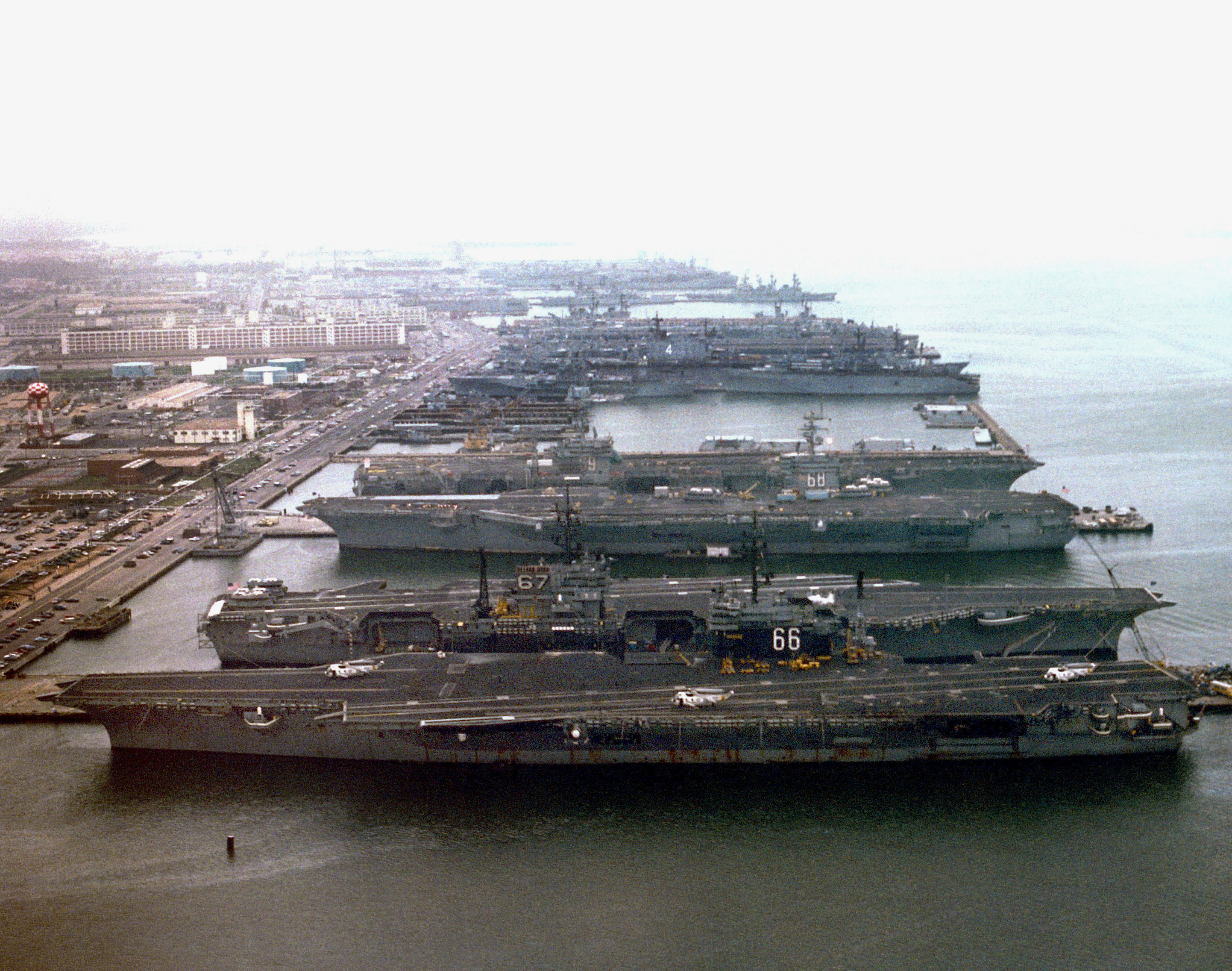
America at Norfolk, alongside John F. Kennedy, Nimitz and Dwight D. Eisenhower in October 1985

Reaching Málaga, Spain, on 21 May, the carrier commenced her transit of the Mediterranean on 29 May and reached Port Said on 3 June. Transiting the Suez Canal on the following day she passed through the Red Sea and joined the 7th Fleet on 8 June, relieving Kitty Hawk. On 10 July, while operating in the Indian Ocean, America lost an EA-6B Prowler from the VAQ-135 Black Ravens due to a failure of the waist catapult system. The crew ejected but the pilot, LTJG Michael Debartolomeo was killed in the process. An investigation into the Class A mishap revealed that faulty maintenance of the catapult system was to blame. Returning to the 6th Fleet on 29 August, America transited the Suez Canal on 2 September bound for Naples.

The carrier visited Monaco from 13 to 22 September before she participated in one phase of NATO exercise, "Display Determination". After stopping briefly to Naples, America returned to sea soon afterwards, and took part in the second phase of "Display Determination" before visiting Catania. She reached Augusta Bay on 27 October, where she was relieved by Dwight D. Eisenhower and sailed for the United States.

Arriving at Norfolk on 14 November, America conducted carrier qualifications in the Virginia Capes operating areas from 29 November – 17 December before returning to port on 18 December. The ship remained in an upkeep status until 18 January 1985, when she shifted to the Norfolk Naval Shipyard for overhaul.

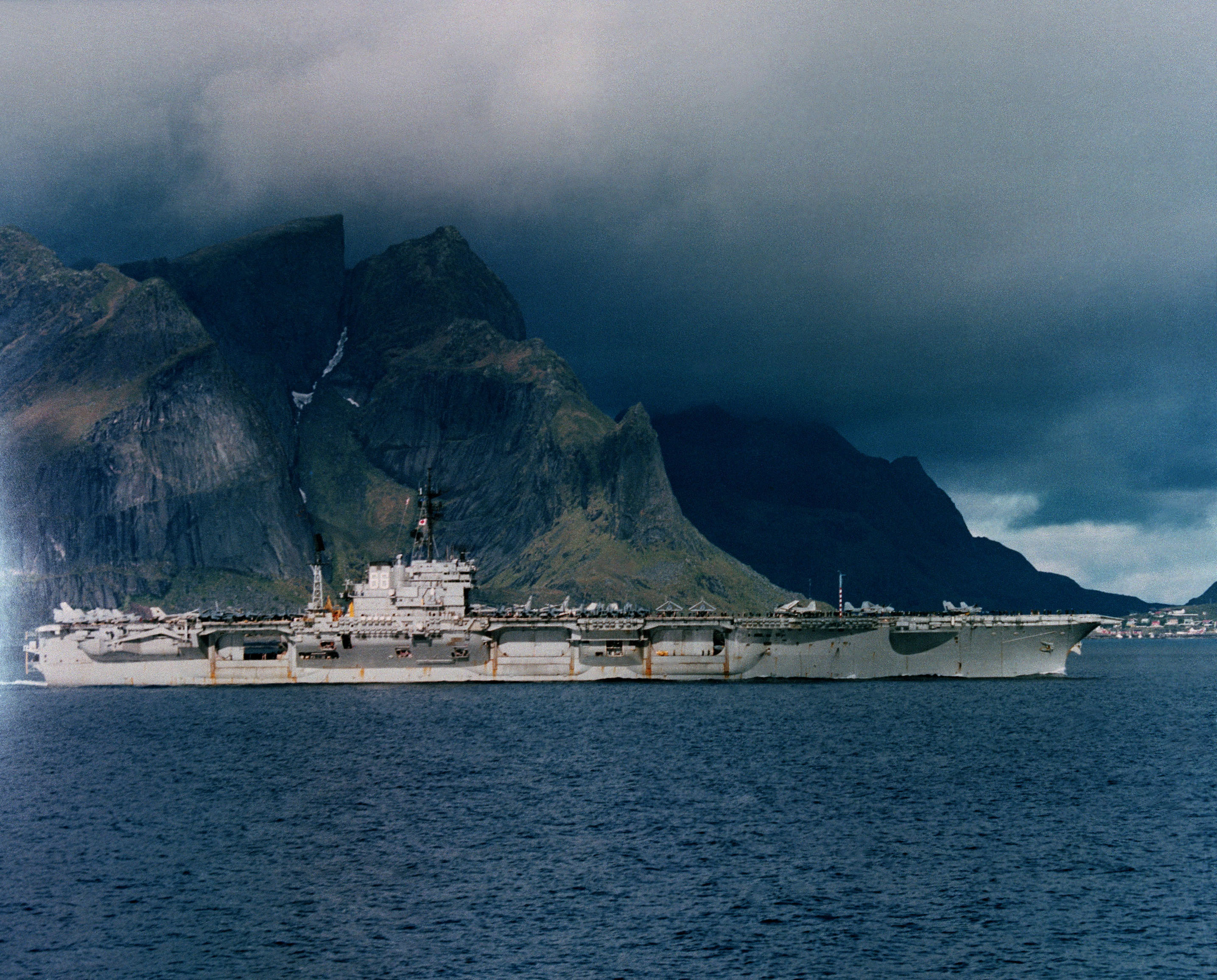
America off Norway during Ocean Safari '85.

Emerging from the yard on 13 May for sea trials off the Virginia Capes, America remained at Norfolk until 28 May, when she sailed to conduct refresher training. Then, following a port call at Port Everglades, Florida (13–17 June), America conducted carrier qualifications before returning to Norfolk on 25 June. The ship operated locally out of Norfolk through mid-August.

America sailed on 24 August to participate in "Ocean Safari", a six-week NATO exercise which ultimately took her to Norwegian waters. After visiting Portsmouth, United Kingdom, upon conclusion of her training, America returned to Norfolk on 9 October. She spent the remainder of the year 1985 alternating periods of upkeep in Norfolk, with local operations in the Virginia Capes operating area.

=== Crisis in Libya ===
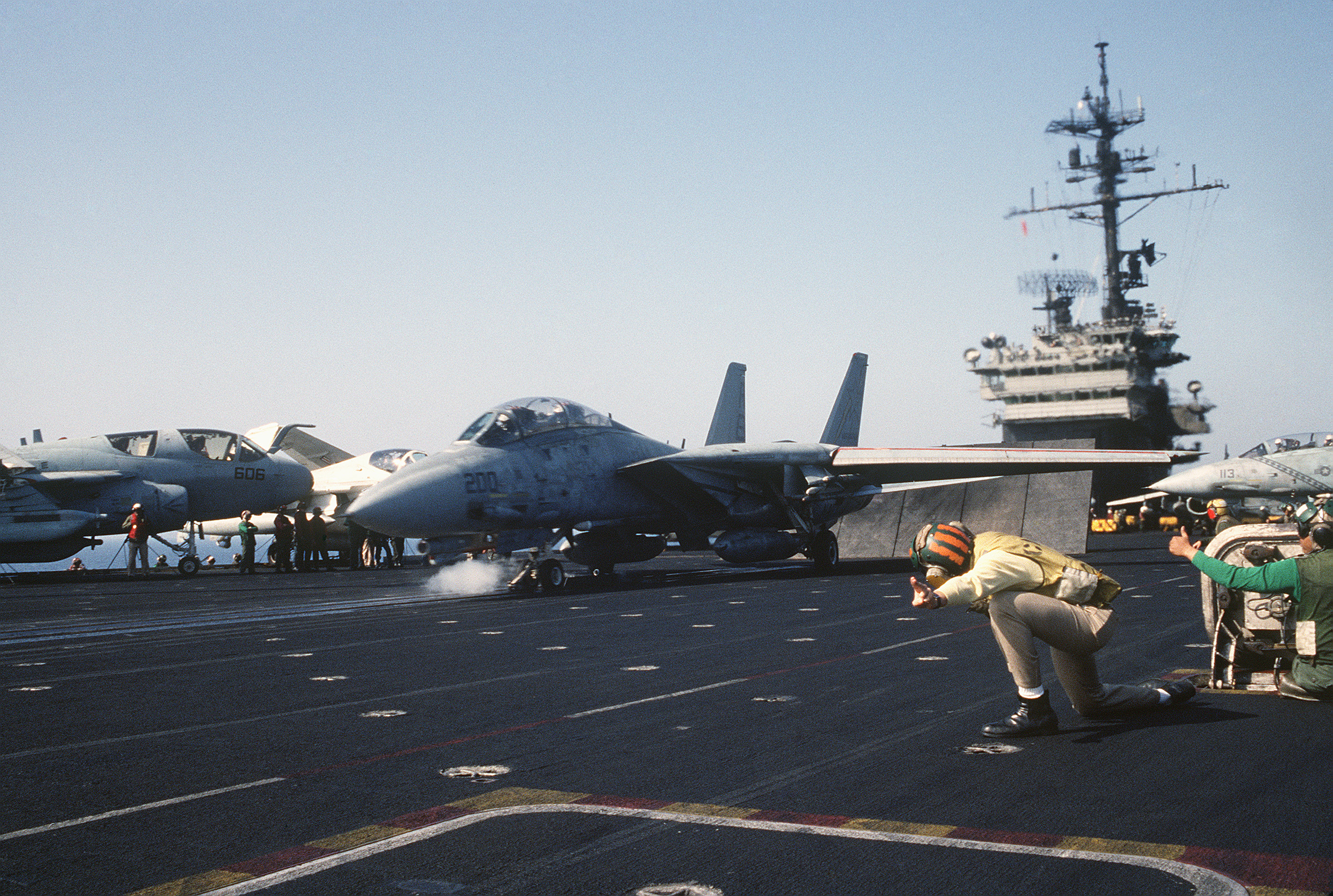
America prepares to launch an F-14 Tomcat off the coast of Libya,1986.

As the new year 1986 began, tensions in the Mediterranean basin would result in America's sailing to deploy with the 6th Fleet one month earlier than planned. On 7 January 1986, President Ronald Reagan ordered all U.S. citizens out of Libya, and broke off all remaining ties between the two nations. At the same time, President Reagan directed the dispatch of a second carrier battle group to the Mediterranean, and directed the Joint Chiefs of Staff to look into military operations against Libya, a country strongly suspected of fomenting terrorist activity.

Operations near Libya began at the end of January. These evolutions, collectively named "Attain Document", were carried out from 24 to 31 January 1986 and from 10 to 15 February, by surface ships and aircraft. America, with CVW-1 embarked, and her accompanying battle group departed Norfolk on 10 March 1986, and arrived in the Mediterranean in time to participate in the third phase of "Attain Document", a freedom of navigation (FON) exercise in the Gulf of Sidra.

Late on 23 March, American planes flew south of latitude 32-30° N – the "Line of Death" proclaimed by Libyan leader Muammar al-Qadaffi. On 24 March, Ticonderoga, accompanied by two destroyers, Scott and Caron, moved south of the "Line", covered by fighter aircraft, at 06:00.

A Libyan missile installation near Surt (Sirte) launched two Soviet-made SA-5 "Gammon" surface-to-air missiles (SAMs) at 07:52, toward F-14A Tomcats of America's VF-102. Later that afternoon, the installation at Surt (Sirte) fired additional SAMs at U.S. planes, but, like the first pair, went wide of their mark. About 14:30, a Libyan missile-equipped Combattante II G-type patrol craft sortied from Misratah, Libya, and approached Ticonderoga and her consorts. Two A-6E Intruders from America's Attack Squadron 34 (VA 34) fired AGM-84 Harpoon missiles at the craft and sank her in the first use of the Harpoon in combat. Shortly afterwards, when American radars detected the Libyan installation at Sirte activating its target acquisition radars, two A-7 Corsairs from Saratoga's VA-81 put the site out of action with AGM-88 HARMs (high-speed anti-radiation missiles).

One hour after the first patrol boat had sortied, a Soviet-built Nanuchka-type patrol craft began heading out into the Gulf of Sidra. Intruders from VA-34 and Saratoga's VA-85 attacked with Rockeye cluster bombs, but the craft sought refuge alongside a neutral merchant ship, and avoided destruction. Damaged, she returned to the Port of Benghazi after nightfall.

The following day, at 02:00 25 March, another Nanuchka-II-type patrol boat entered International waters and came under attack from Intruders from VA-85 and Coral Sea's VA-55; the former utilized Rockeyes in the attack, the latter then sank the craft with a Harpoon. The same squadrons then attacked and damaged a second Nanuchka-II, forcing her to put into Benghazi.

"Attain Document III" came to a close at 09:00 on 27 March, three days ahead of schedule and after 48 hours of largely unchallenged use of the Gulf of Sidra by the U.S. Navy. Thence steaming to Augusta Bay, Sicily, America relieved Saratoga on station, and subsequently visited Livorno, Italy, from 4–8 April 1986.

In the meantime, however, in the wake of the strikes designed to let Col. Qaddafi know that the United States had not only the desire but the capability to respond effectively to terrorism, intelligence information indicated that Qaddafi intended to retaliate.

==== Libyan retaliation ====
On 5 April 1986, two days after a bomb exploded on board a Trans World Airlines (TWA) flight en route to Athens from Rome, killing four U.S. citizens, a bomb exploded in the La Belle Discothèque in West Berlin, killing two U.S. servicemen and a Turkish civilian. Another 222 people were wounded in the bombing – 78 Americans among them. Colonel Qaddafi threatened to escalate the violence against Americans, civilian and military, throughout the world.

Repeated efforts by the United States to persuade the Libyan leader to forsake terrorism as an instrument of policy, including an attempt to persuade other western nations to isolate Libya peacefully, failed. Rumors of retaliation by the United States were soon followed by Qaddafi's threat to take all foreigners in Libya hostage, to use them as a shield to protect his military installations. In light of that threat, and of the failure to gain peaceful sanctions against Libya, and citing "incontrovertible evidence" of Libyan complicity in the recent terrorist acts, President Reagan directed that attacks on terrorist-related targets in Libya be carried out.

==== Operation El Dorado Canyon ====
Operation "El Dorado Canyon" commenced early on the afternoon of 14 April 1986 around 1700 hours British Time as tanker aircraft took off from American RAF bases in England to support the US Air Force General Dynamics F-111F Aardvark and EF-111A Raven planes that soon followed them into the air from other American RAF bases. Thus began their 3,000 mi (4,800 km) trip to the target, flying around the Iberian Peninsula and through the Strait of Gibraltar, thereby avoiding over flight over France, Spain, and possibly Portugal. Later that afternoon, between 17:45 and 18:20 local time in the Mediterranean Sea, America launched six A-6 Intruder strike aircraft from VA-34 and six A-7E Corsair IIs (strike support); Coral Sea launched her strike/strike support aircraft, eight A-6Es from VA-55 and six F/A-18 Hornets between 17:50 and 18:20. Both carriers launched additional aircraft to support the strike to provide CAP and other functions.

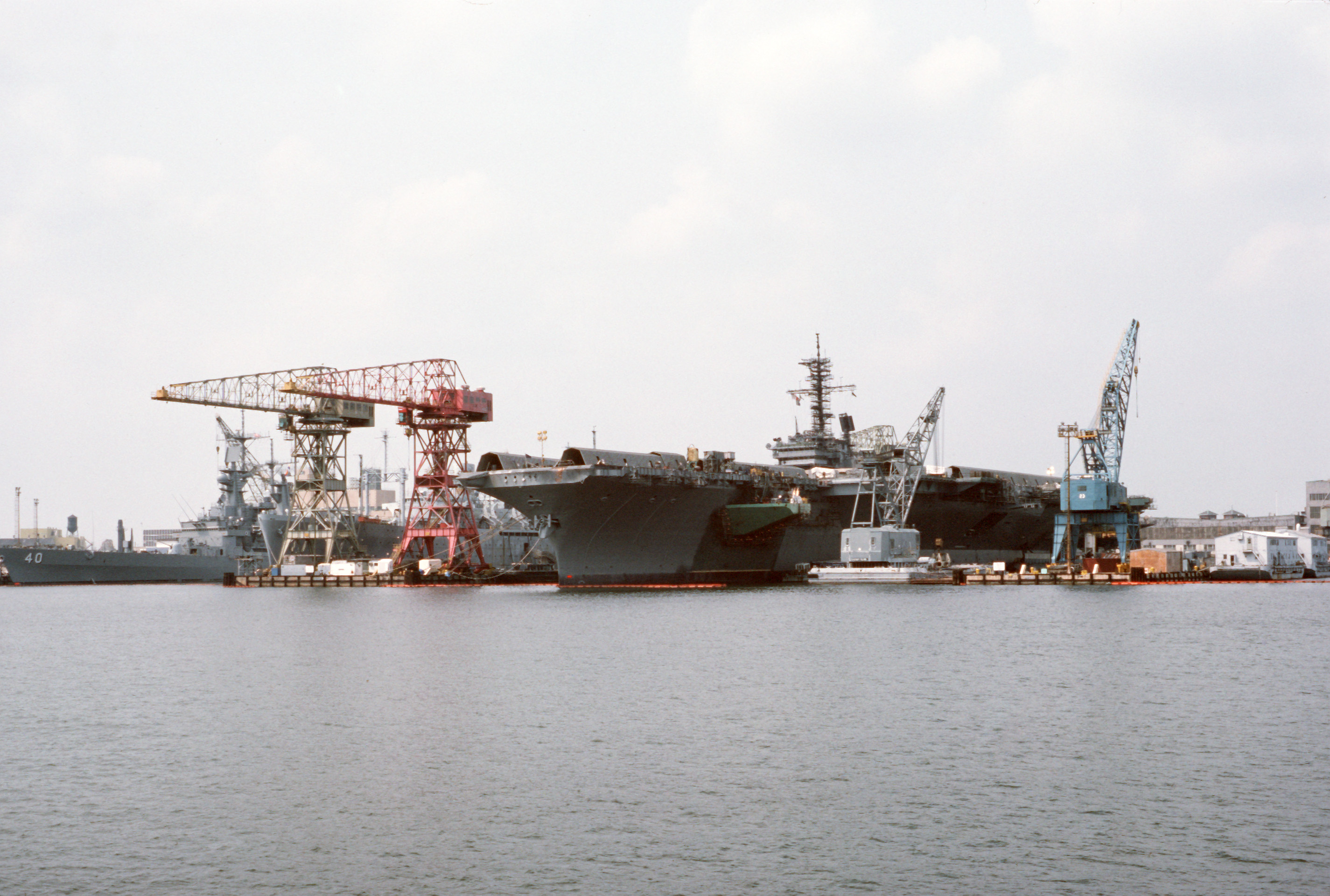
America in Norfolk Naval Shipyard, 1987.

"In a spectacular feat of mission planning and execution", the Navy and Air Force planes, based 3,000 mi (4,800 km) apart, reached their targets on time at 19:00. The F-18 Hornets from Coral Sea and A-7 Corsair IIs from America launched air-to-surface Shrike and HARM missiles against Libyan SAM sites at Benghazi and Tripoli. Moments later, VA-34's A-6E Intruders dropped their Mk. 82 bombs on the Benghazi military barracks, believed to be an alternate command and control facility for terrorist activities and a billeting area for Qaddafi's elite Jamahiriya Guard, as well as a warehouse for components for MiG aircraft. VA-34's attack heavily damaged the warehouse, destroying four crated MiGs and damaging a fifth.

Following that counter-terrorist strike, America visited Naples from 28 April – 4 May, and then participated in NATO exercise "Distant Hammer" with units of the Italian and Turkish Air Forces, and visited Nice/Monaco upon conclusion of the evolution. During June, the carrier operated with Coral Sea and the newly arrived Enterprise, and took part in a "poopdeck" exercise with Spanish and United States Air Force units off the coast of Spain, arriving at Palma soon after.

Participating in a NATO exercise, "Tridente", in late June, America visited Naples before she participated in a "National Week" exercise. Subsequently, visiting Catania and operating in the central and western Mediterranean, the carrier wound up the month of July at Benidorm, Spain, before returning to sea for further operations at sea in that region. Visiting Naples from 11 to 17 August, America spent the rest of her deployment in operations in the western and central Mediterranean before John F. Kennedy relieved her at Rota from 28 to 31 August. America arrived back at Norfolk Naval Shipyard on 20 November 1986 for an overhaul which lasted until 11 February 1988. She spent the remainder of that year operating along the East Coast and in the Caribbean.

America participated in Operation North Star during February and March 1989, an exercise to rehearse the Vestfjord operations planned to project power over the Kola peninsula against the Soviet Union. She was shadowed by a Soviet Slava-class cruiser, but shed her tail on departure from the fjord. She returned to Norfolk from the mini-deployment in April to prepare for her upcoming major deployment. America departed Norfolk 11 May 1989 for her sixteenth major deployment, to the Mediterranean and Indian Ocean.

Her journey was not without incident. On 13 May 1989, a failed turnover of JP-5 pumproom monitors resulted in a fire and explosion, killing two crew members. The ship was briefly endangered, but after 7 hours of firefighting the situation was under control and normal operations resumed. On 11 August, Coral Sea and America departed early from separate port visits when they were diverted to the eastern Mediterranean as a show of force in the wake of the suspected hanging of Marine Corps LtCol William R. Higgins by Middle East terrorists, and threats to other hostages. LtCol Higgins had been kidnapped in February 1988 while a member of the United Nations peacekeeping forces in Lebanon.

On September 6th, USS America participated in the evacuation of the American embassy in Beirut, Lebanon. Three helicopters rescued the remaining 30 embassy diplomats and flew them to Cyprus. After operations in the Mediterranean, Persian Gulf and Indian Ocean, America returned home on 10 November 1989.

She later evacuated the American Embassy in Lebanon in 1989, and also went on a six-month deployment from May 1989 to November 1989 and served during Operations Desert Shield and Desert Storm in 1990 and 1991. America also Participated in Operation Deny Flight in the mid-1990s.

=== Persian Gulf War: Operations Desert Shield and Desert Storm ===
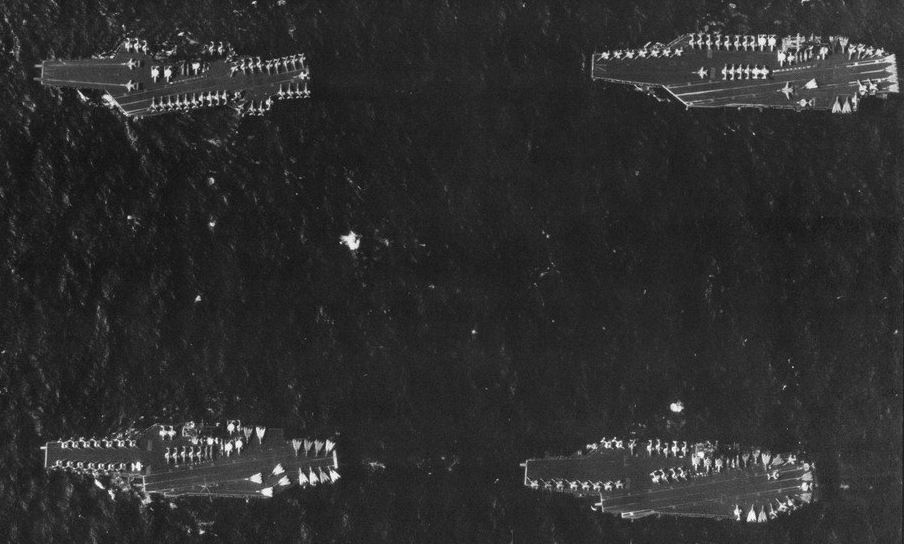
Four U.S. Navy carriers form "Battle Force Zulu" following the Persian Gulf War; America (bottom right) cruises with Midway (top left), Theodore Roosevelt (top right) and Ranger (bottom left)

On 2 August 1990, the day America departed the Norfolk Naval Shipyard following a four-month Selected Restricted Availability, Iraq invaded Kuwait. As the international community geared toward possible military action against Iraq, America and CVW-1 rushed toward a much accelerated deployment schedule.

On 28 December, just over four months after her SRA and having completed a five-month training cycle into two months, America deployed to the Red Sea in support of Operation Desert Shield with Captain J. J. Mazach in command. At that time, the combined Command, Control, Communication, Cryptology, and Intelligence (C4I) package installed aboard America included systems such as the Navy Tactical Command System Afloat (NTCSA), the Contingency Tactical Action Planning System (CTAPS) and Advance Tracking Prototype.

Although these systems were not unique to the fleet, it was the first time they had been integrated into one comprehensive package. Coupled with the disseminated capabilities of the Naval Tactical Data System (NTDS), America's C4I package allowed intelligence and operations information to be meshed together into one single tactical picture. Utilizing digital data links between other ships, America had intelligence processing capabilities unparalleled by any other ship in the fleet. America also deployed with B57 and B61 nuclear weapons aboard.

On 9 January 1991, the America Battle Group transited the Strait of Gibraltar and sailed into the Mediterranean. Less than a week later, on 15–16 January, she passed through the Suez Canal and into the Red Sea on the UN-imposed deadline for Iraq's unconditional withdrawal from Kuwait. The America joined Saratoga and John F. Kennedy battle groups to form Battle Force Red Sea. At 02:00 hours (Saudi time) on 17 January, Operation Desert Shield became Operation Desert Storm. America's embarked airwing, CVW-1, initially provided Combat Air Patrol coverage over the battle force.

On the second day of the war, America launched its first air strikes, targeting and destroying an ammunition depot north of Baghdad. In the next day's darkness, CVW-1 flew its first night strike of the war against an oil production facility. Strikes of up to five hours into Iraq against bridges, mobile Scud sites, oil production facilities and Iraqi Republican Guard units continued for three weeks, when the focus of the air war changed. On 9 February Captain Kent W. Ewing took command of the great warship at an informal ceremony on the flight deck and newly selected Rear Admiral Mazach departed under orders to his new assignment.

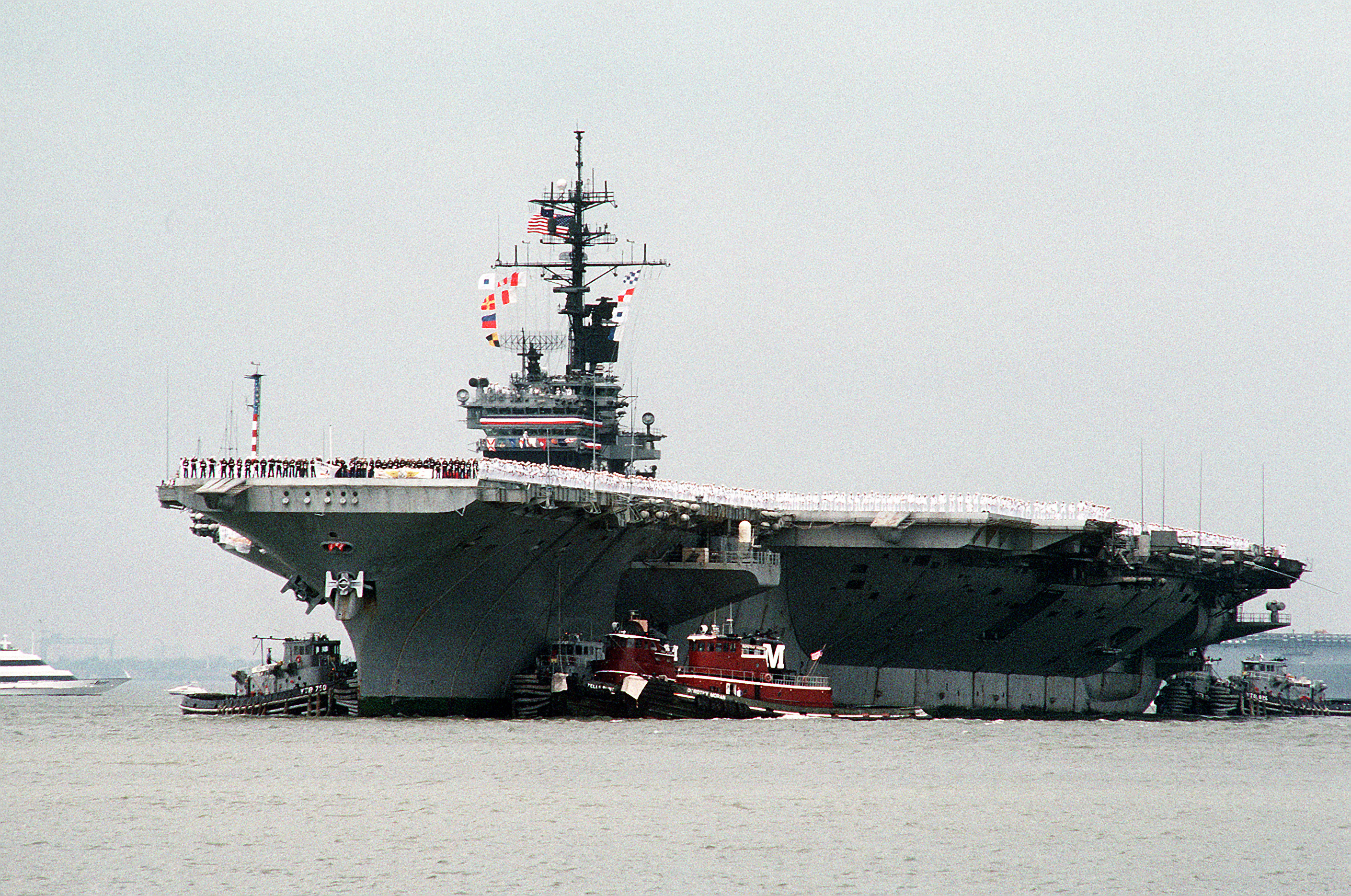
America returns from the Gulf War.

On 14 February, America entered the Persian Gulf to become the fourth carrier of Battle Force Zulu. Joining Midway, Ranger and Theodore Roosevelt strikes were flown into the Kuwait Theater of Operations (KTO), with attacks on Iraqi military forces in Kuwait proper, as well as targets in eastern Iraq. This would make America the only carrier to operate on both sides of the Arabian Peninsula during Desert Storm. On 20 February, America's VS-32 became the first S-3 squadron to engage, bomb and destroy a hostile vessel–an Iraqi gunboat. On 23 February, aircraft from America destroyed a Silkworm (anti-ship) missile battery after Iraq unsuccessfully fired a missile at Missouri.

The focus of the war changed again on 24 February with the beginning of the ground assault into Iraq and Kuwait. America aircraft provided air support for coalition troops by attacking Iraqi troop, tank and artillery sites in Kuwait, including the highway of death. One hundred hours later, Kuwait was successfully liberated and a cease-fire was ordered. CVW-1's aircraft were credited with destroying close to 387 armored vehicles and tanks in the KTO.

America departed the Persian Gulf on 4 March, with CVW-1 having conducted 3,008 combat sorties, dropped over 2,000 short tons (1,800 t) of ordnance and suffered no aircraft losses during the war. The Red Sea coastal town of Hurghada, Egypt would be America's only port visit from 16 to 22 March, following 78 consecutive days at sea.

After passing through the Suez Canal and exiting the Mediterranean, America reached Norfolk on 18 April. She and CVW-1 earned a Navy Unit Commendation, a third for America, for service during Desert Storm. After a short stay at home, and participating in New York City's Operation Welcome Home/Fleet Week festivities, America and CVW-1 once again headed for the Northern Atlantic to participate in NATO exercise "North Star". Departing Norfolk in August for eight weeks, she became the first carrier to conduct flight operations within Havesfjord, Norway. Less than two months later, America departed on 2 December for her second deployment of the year. This uneventful six-month deployment would see America return to the Persian Gulf, and thus become the first carrier to redeploy to the region following the Gulf War. The entire Kuwaiti leadership and US Ambassador visited for a day to extend their praise and thanks for saving their country.

Exercises were conducted in the Indian Ocean, Red Sea, and the Mediterranean, before returning to Norfolk in June 1992.

=== Final deployments ===
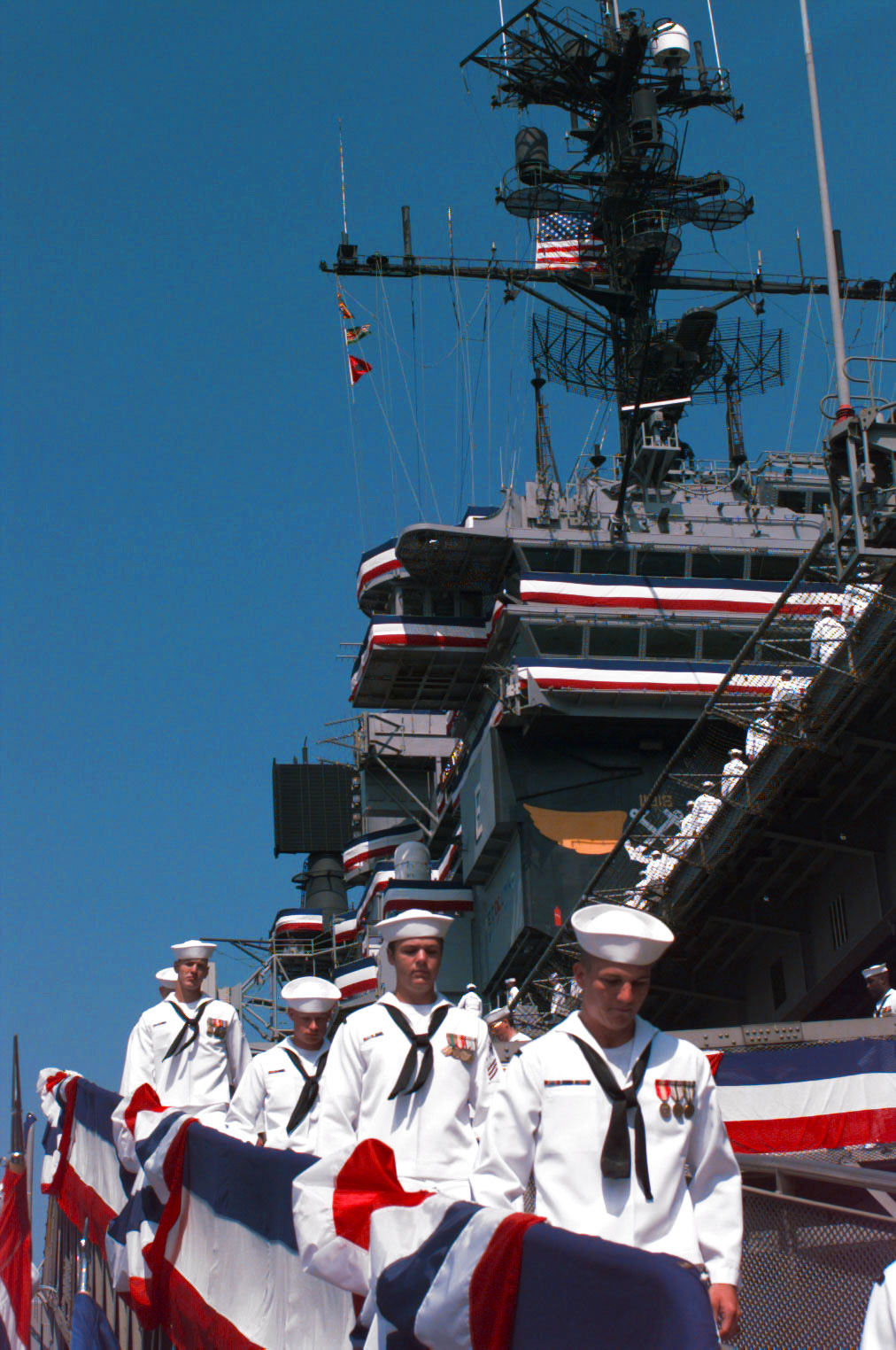
America's crew leave the ship for the last time during her decommissioning ceremony in August 1996

America and her Joint Task Group departed Norfolk and other east Coast ports on 11 August 1993 for another major Mediterranean deployment to relieve Theodore Roosevelt in Operation Deny Flight. After several weeks supporting United Nations peacekeeping efforts over Bosnia and Herzegovina, America transited the Suez on 29 October 1993 to relieve Abraham Lincoln in the Indian Ocean in support of UN humanitarian efforts in Somalia. She was followed, on 1 November by members of her battle group, Simpson and the replenished oiler Savannah.

America covered over 2,500 mi (4,000 km) in a week. Supporting the U.N humanitarian efforts in Somalia was the Naval Battle Force Somalia, commanded by Rear Adm. Arthur Cebrowski, Commander, Carrier Group 6 on America. Other elements of naval battle force Somalia include Simpson, amphibious vessels New Orleans, Denver, Comstock, Cayuga and the 13th Marine Expeditionary Unit.

Before returning to the Mediterranean, CVW-1 aircraft flew missions into southern Iraq from the Red Sea in support of Operation Southern Watch. On 12 December 1993, America transited the Suez before returning to Norfolk in February 1994.

A unique operation developed 12 September 1994 due to the situation in Haiti. Dwight D. Eisenhower and America deployed with a large contingent of Army helicopters on board, but no air wings. The carriers headed for the Caribbean in support of President Bill Clinton policy to restore democracy to Haiti. Dwight D. Eisenhower also embarked Navy squadrons HS-7, HCS-4 and HC-2. This was the first time that carriers deployed operationally with a large contingent of Army helicopters and no air wing on board.

On 28 August 1995, America departed Norfolk on her 20th and final deployment in her 30-year history for anything but a routine six-month deployment to the Mediterranean, the Adriatic Sea and the Persian Gulf. She crossed the Atlantic Ocean in three days rather than the usual six-day transit through a Perfect Storm after leaving Norfolk. The carrier participated in Operation Deny Flight and Operation Deliberate Force, in association with the UN and NATO, and also flew missions in support of Operation Southern Watch over Iraq. America visited the capital city of Valletta, Malta, in January 1996 – the first U.S. Navy carrier to visit this historical port in over 24 years. America, operating from the Adriatic Sea, supported the NATO Implementation Force in Bosnia and Herzegovina for Operation Joint Endeavor before returning to Norfolk, Virginia on 24 February 1996.

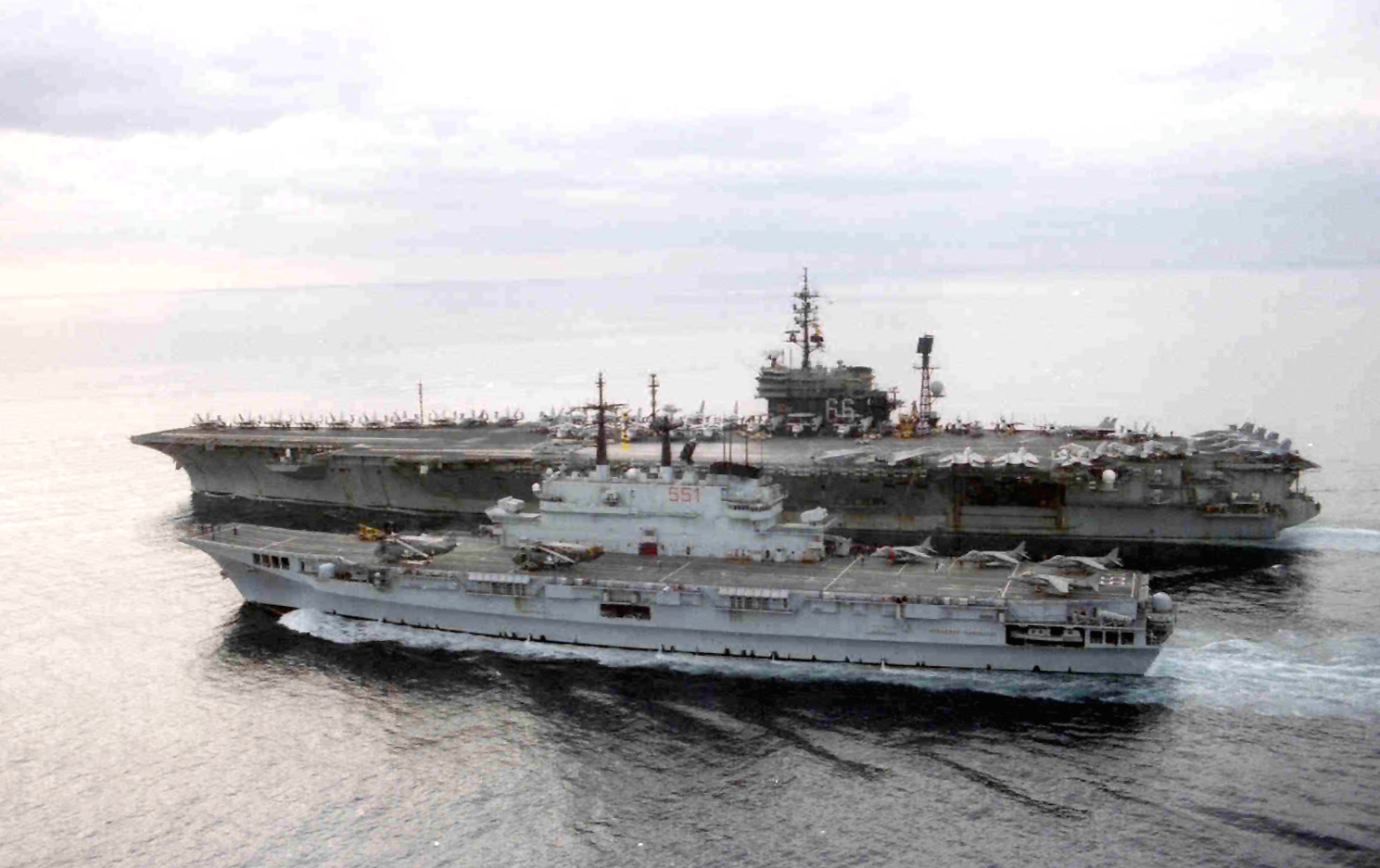
America operating with the Italian aircraft carrier Giuseppe Garibaldi during her final deployment in January 1996

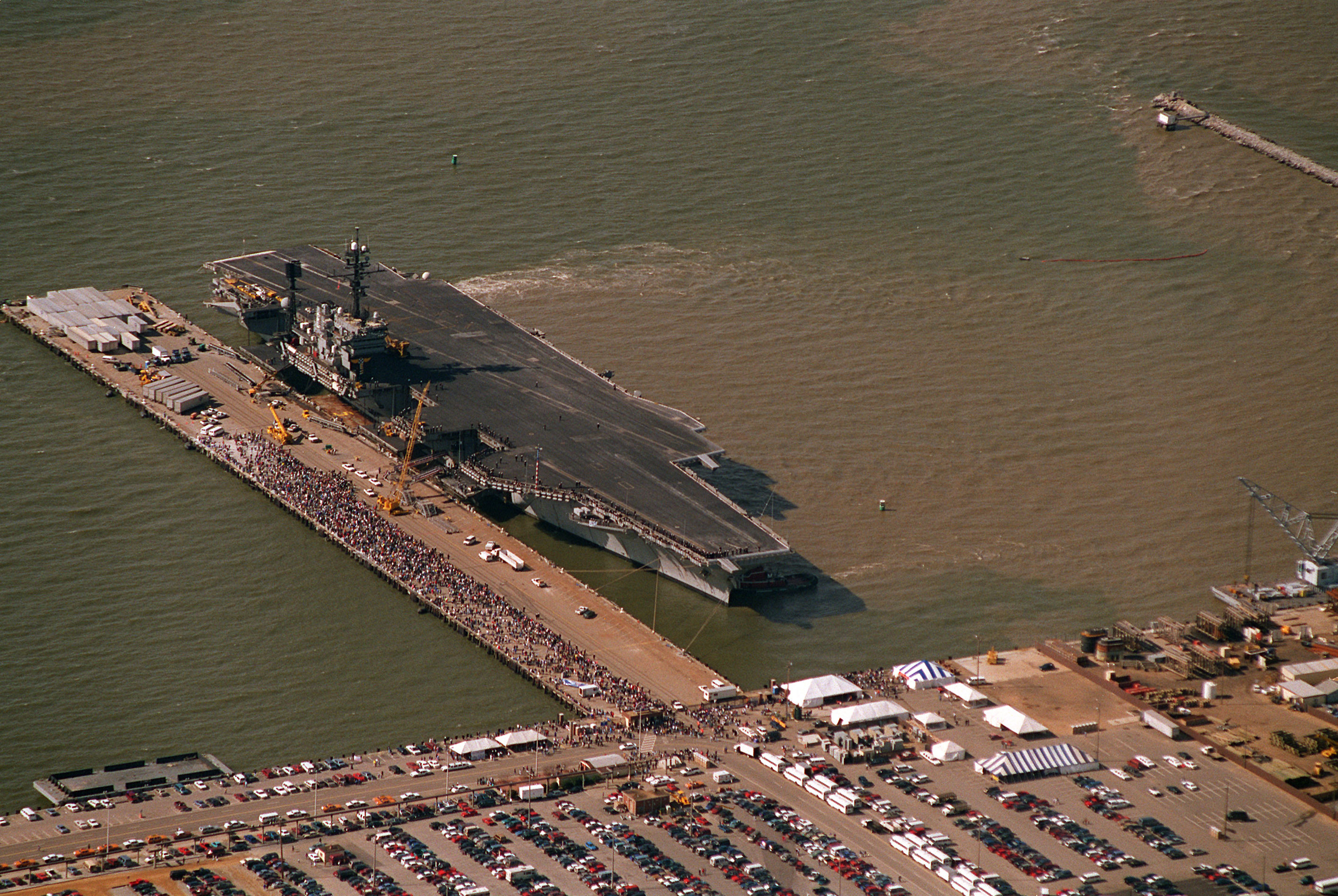
USS America returns from her final deployment, 28 January 1996

=== Decommissioning ===
Originally scheduled to undergo a Service Life Extension Program (SLEP) in 1996 for subsequent retirement in 2010, CV-66 fell victim to budget cuts and was instead retired early by the U.S. Navy.

She was decommissioned in a ceremony at Norfolk Naval Shipyard in Portsmouth, Virginia on 9 August 1996. America's final commanding officer was Capt. Robert E. Besal. The guest speaker for the ceremony was Adm. Leighton W. "Snuffy" Smith, a former America commanding officer. Following the decommissioning, America was stricken from the Naval Vessel Register and was transferred to the Ready Reserve Fleet at the Inactive Ship Maintenance Facility in Philadelphia, Pennsylvania. Though already decommissioned, she was awarded the 1995 Battenberg Cup in recognition of her crew's achievements in her last full year in service.

== Post decommissioning service ==
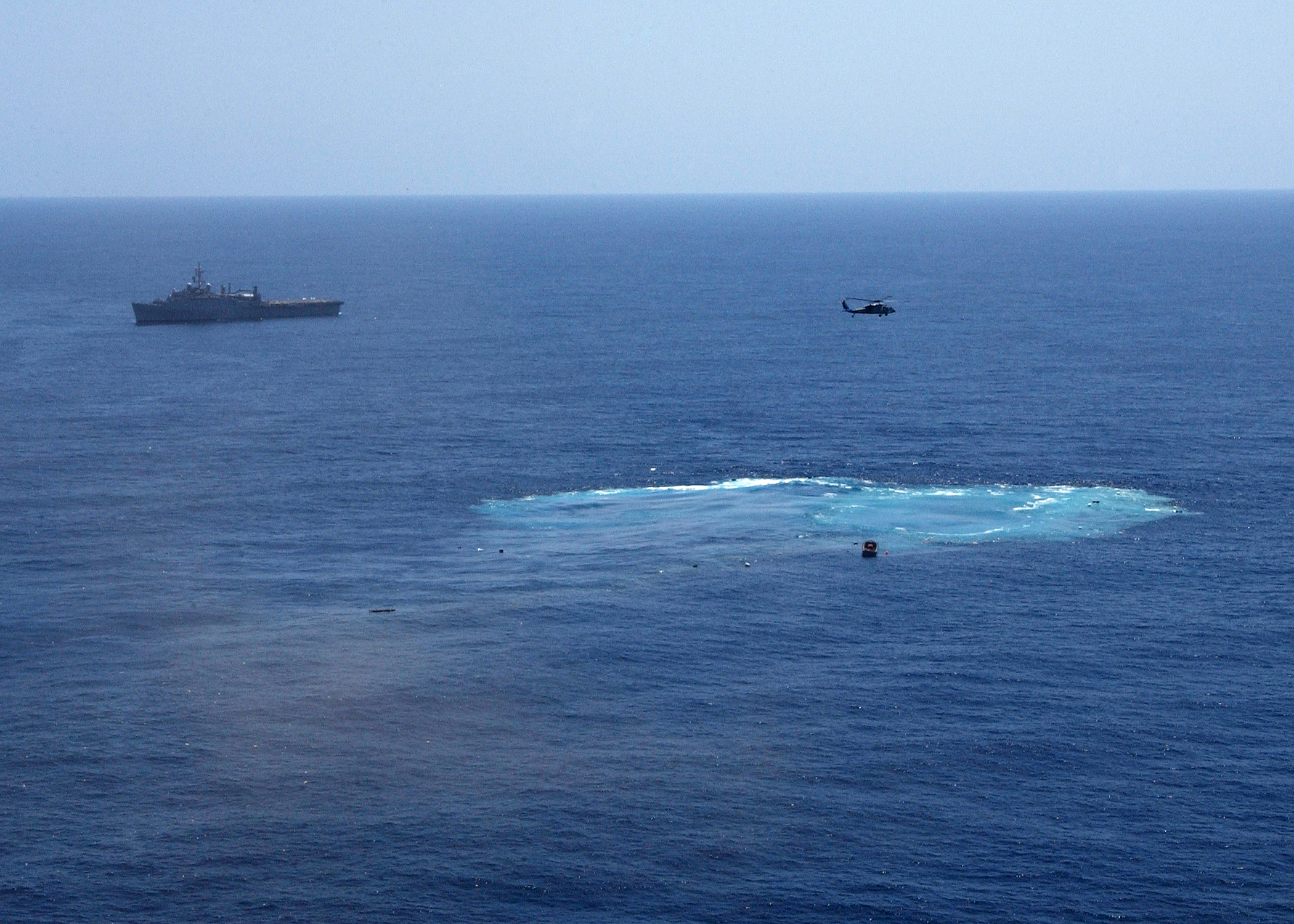
The wake left by America following her use as a live-fire target in 2005. The ship was used as a platform to test how the hull of large aircraft carriers would hold up against underwater attacks. Following the tests, America was scuttled, serving as a further test of the sinking of a large aircraft carrier.

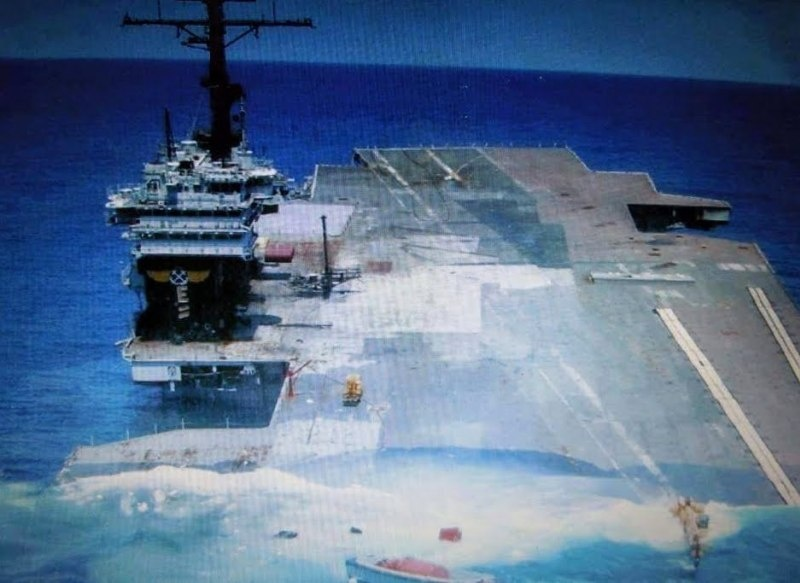
A declassified image of USS America sinking by the bow after weeks of weapons tests.

America was planned to be sold for scrapping. In 2005, she was chosen to be a live-fire test and evaluation platform, to aid the design of future aircraft carriers. There was some objection to a ship being named America being deliberately sunk at sea, and a committee of her former crew members and other supporters attempted to save the ship for use as a museum ship. Their efforts were ultimately unsuccessful. In a letter to them, then-Vice Chief of Naval Operations Admiral John B. Nathman explained:

America will make one final and vital contribution to our national defense, this time as a live-fire test and evaluation platform. America's legacy will serve as a footprint in the design of future carriers – ships that will protect the sons, daughters, grandchildren and great-grandchildren of America veterans. We will conduct a variety of comprehensive tests above and below the waterline collecting data for use by naval architects and engineers in creating the nation's future carrier fleet. It is essential we make those ships as highly survivable as possible. When that mission is complete, the America will slip quietly beneath the sea. I know America has a very special place in your hearts, not only for the name, but also for your service aboard her. I ask that you understand why we selected this ship for this one last crucial mission and make note of the critical nature of her final service.

On 25 February 2005, a ceremony to salute America and her crew was held at the ship's pier in Philadelphia, sponsored by the USS America Carrier Veterans Association, Inc. and the America Museum Foundation, and attended by former crew members and various dignitaries. She departed the Inactive Ship Maintenance Facility on 19 April 2005 to conduct the aforementioned tests. The experiments lasted approximately four weeks. The Navy tested America with underwater explosives, watching from afar and through monitoring devices placed on the vessel. These explosions were designed to simulate underwater attacks.

After the completion of the tests, America was sunk in a controlled scuttling on 14 May 2005 at approximately 11:30. The sinking was publicized six days later. At the time, no warship of that size had ever been sunk, and effects were closely monitored. Theoretically, the tests would reveal data about how supercarriers respond to battle damage.

On 16 May 2005, Naval Sea Systems Command released the following statement:

On 14 May at approximately 1130 am EDT, a solemn moment of silence was held as the aircraft carrier ex-America slipped quietly beneath the waves. The data collected during the 25 days at sea from these test events will be of great value to Navy engineers and designers to improve the design and survivability of the nation's future aircraft carrier fleet. The Navy provided a video of a memorial ceremony held onboard America before being scuttled, and a bronze plaque to members of the USS America Carrier Veterans Association and the America Museum Foundation. We thank and honor all the veterans of the USS America who lived and fought for freedom and democracy aboard this majestic vessel.

=== Scuttling location ===
The U.S. Navy released the exact location where America was sunk: 33°09′09″N 71°39′07″W, around 250 nautical miles (460 km; 290 mi) southeast of Cape Hatteras. The wreck lies upright in one piece 16,860 ft (5,140 m) below the surface of the Atlantic Ocean.

== See also ==
- List of aircraft carriers
- List of aircraft carriers of the United States Navy

== Bibliography ==
- "America III (CVA-66)". Dictionary of American Naval Fighting Ships. Navy Department, Naval History and Heritage Command.
- Elward, Brad (2014). US Cold War Aircraft Carriers. Oxford, United Kingdom: Osprey Publishing. ISBN 978-1-78200-380-9.
