= List of ship commissionings in 1972 =

The list of ship commissionings in 1972 includes a chronological list of all ships commissioned in 1972.

	Operator	Ship	Flag	Class and type	Pennant	Other notes
27 January	Swedish Lloyd	Saga	Sweden	Ferry		Formerly Hispania with the same company
7 February	Stena Line	Stena Atlantica	Sweden	Ferry		Formerly Saga with Swedish Lloyd (not the Saga above)
12 February	United States Navy	Barbour County		Newport-class tank landing ship	LST-1195	
17 February	Finland Steamship Company	Aallotar	Finland	Ferry		For Silja Line traffic
18 March	Baltic Shipping Company	Mikhail Lermontov	Soviet Union	Ivan Franko-class passenger liner		
8 April	United States Navy	Harlan County		Newport-class tank landing ship	LST-1196	
19 April	Rederi Ab Sally	Viking 3	Finland	Ferry		For Viking Line traffic
5 May	United States Navy	Silversides		Sturgeon-class submarine	SSN-679	
6 May	United States Navy	Bagley		Knox-class frigate	FF-1069	
13 May	United States Navy	Mount Vernon		Anchorage-class dock landing ship	LSD-39	
25 May	Rederi AB Svea	Svea Regina	Sweden	Ferry		For Silja Line traffic
27 May	United States Navy	Barnstable County		Newport-class tank landing ship	LST-1197	
8 July	United States Navy	Brewton		Knox-class frigate	FF-1086	
15 July	Jydsk Færgefart A/S	Kattegat	Denmark	Ferry		
22 July	United States Navy	Donald B. Beary		Knox-class frigate	FF-1085	
28 July	National Navy of Uruguay	18 De Julio		Dealey-class destroyer escort	DE-3	Ex-USS Dealey
5 August	United States Navy	Bristol County		Newport-class tank landing ship	LST-1198	
8 September	United States Navy	Kirk		Knox-class frigate	FF-1087	
25 October	Soviet Navy	Admiral Makarov		Project 1134A Berkut A large anti-submarine ship		
11 November	United States Navy	Barbey		Knox-class frigate	FF-1088	
11 December	Rederi AB Slite	Diana	Sweden	Ferry		For Viking Line traffic
Unknown	Bolivarian Navy of Venezuela	Tiburon		Balao-class submarine	S-12	Ex-USS Cubera
