= USS La Moure County (LST-1194) =

Newport-class tank landing ship

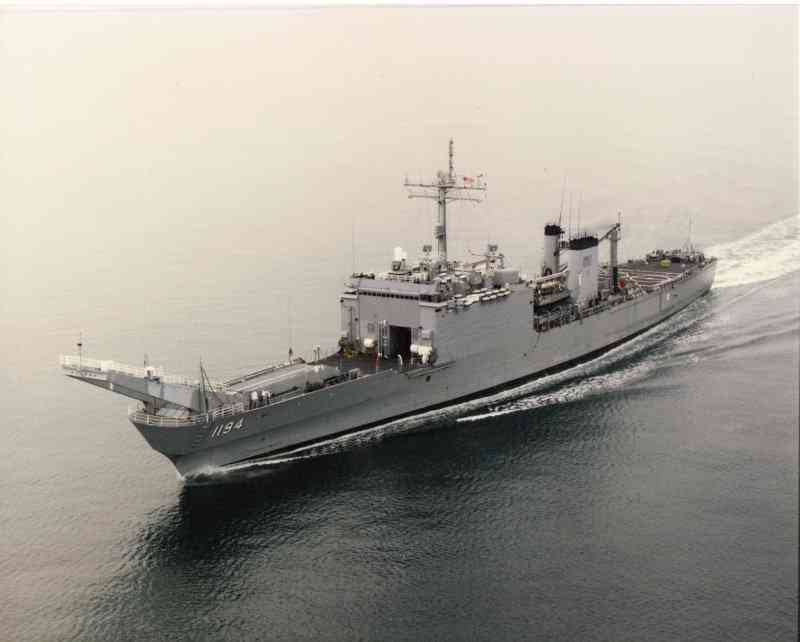
- USS La Moure County (LST-1194) underway

History

United States
- Name: USS La Moure County
- Namesake: LaMoure County, North Dakota
- Builder: National Steel and Shipbuilding Company, San Diego, California
- Laid down: 22 May 1970
- Launched: 13 February 1971
- Commissioned: 18 December 1971
- Decommissioned: 17 November 2000
- Stricken: 17 November 2000
- Identification: LST-1194
- Fate: Sunk as a target, 10 July 2001

General characteristics as built
- Class & type: Newport-class tank landing ship
- Displacement: 4,793 long tons (4,870 t) light; 8,342 long tons (8,476 t) full load
- Length: 522 ft 4 in (159.2 m) oa; 562 ft (171.3 m) over derrick arms
- Beam: 69 ft 6 in (21.2 m)
- Draft: 17 ft 6 in (5.3 m) max
- Propulsion: 2 shafts; 6 Alco diesel engines (3 per shaft); 16,500 shp (12,300 kW); Bow thruster
- Speed: 22 knots (41 km/h; 25 mph) max
- Range: 2,500 nmi (4,600 km; 2,900 mi) at 14 knots (26 km/h; 16 mph)
- Troops: 431 max
- Complement: 213
- Sensors & processing systems: 2 × Mk 63 GCFS; SPS-10 radar
- Armament: 2 × twin 3"/50 caliber guns
- Aviation facilities: Helicopter deck

USS La Moure County (LST-1194) was the sixteenth of twenty Newport-class tank landing ship of the United States Navy (USN) which replaced the traditional bow door-design tank landing ships (LSTs). The second vessel named after a county in North Dakota, the LST was constructed by National Steel and Shipbuilding Company of San Diego, California. The vessel was launched and was commissioned into the USN in 1971. La Moure County alternated deployments in the Caribbean Sea with those to the Mediterranean Sea. During the Gulf War, La Moure County transported elements of the 4th Marine Expeditionary Brigade to the Persian Gulf. In 2000, the LST was taking part in a training exercise off Chile when the vessel ran aground. Considered beyond repair, La Moure County was decommissioned that year and towed out to sea in 2001 and sunk as a target ship.

== Design and description ==
La Moure County was a Newport-class tank landing ship which were designed to meet the goal put forward by the United States amphibious forces to have a tank landing ship (LST) capable of over 20 knots (37 km/h; 23 mph). However, the traditional bow door form for LSTs would not be capable. Therefore, the designers of the Newport class came up with a design of a traditional ship hull with a 112-foot (34 m) aluminum ramp slung over the bow supported by two derrick arms. The 34-long-ton (35 t) ramp was capable of sustaining loads up to 75 long tons (76 t). This made the Newport class the first to depart from the standard LST design that had been developed in early World War II.

The LST had a displacement of 4,793 long tons (4,870 t) when light and 8,342 long tons (8,476 t) at full load. La Moure County was 522 feet 4 inches (159.2 m) long overall and 562 ft (171.3 m) over the derrick arms which protruded past the bow. The vessel had a beam of 69 ft 6 in (21.2 m), a draft forward of 11 ft 5 in (3.5 m) and 17 ft 5 in (5.3 m) at the stern at full load.

La Moure County was fitted with six Alco 16-645-ES diesel engines turning two shafts, three to each shaft. The system was rated at 16,500 brake horsepower (12,300 kW) and gave the ship a maximum speed of 22 knots (41 km/h; 25 mph) for short periods and could only sustain 20 knots (37 km/h; 23 mph) for an extended length of time. The LST carried 1,750 long tons (1,780 t) of diesel fuel for a range of 2,500 nautical miles (4,600 km; 2,900 mi) at the cruising speed of 14 knots (26 km/h; 16 mph). The ship was also equipped with a bow thruster to allow for better maneuvering near causeways and to hold position while offshore during the unloading of amphibious vehicles.

The Newport class were larger and faster than previous LSTs and were able to transport tanks, heavy vehicles and engineer groups and supplies that were too large for helicopters or smaller landing craft to carry. The LSTs have a ramp forward of the superstructure that connects the lower tank deck with the main deck and a passage large enough to allow access to the parking area amidships. The vessels are also equipped with a stern gate to allow the unloading of amphibious vehicles directly into the water or to unload onto a utility landing craft (LCU) or pier. At either end of the tank deck there is a 30 ft (9.1 m) turntable that permits vehicles to turn around without having to reverse. The Newport class has the capacity for 500 long tons (510 t) of vehicles, 19,000 ft^{2} (1,800 m^{2}) of cargo area and could carry up to 431 troops. The vessels also have davits for four vehicle and personnel landing craft (LCVPs) and could carry four pontoon causeway sections along the sides of the hull.

La Moure County was initially armed with four Mark 33 3-inch (76 mm)/50 caliber guns in two twin turrets. The vessel was equipped with two Mk 63 gun control fire systems (GCFS) for the 3-inch guns, but these were removed in 1977–1978. The ship also had SPS-10 surface search radar. Atop the stern gate, the vessels mounted a helicopter deck. They had a maximum complement of 213 including 11 officers.

== Construction and career ==
The LST was ordered as the seventh hull of the third group of the Newport class in Fiscal Year 1967 and a contract was awarded on 15 July 1966. The ship was laid down on 22 May 1970 by the National Steel and Shipbuilding Company in San Diego, California. Named for a county in North Dakota, La Moure County was launched on 13 February 1971 and commissioned into the United States Navy (USN) on 18 December 1971. The ship was assigned to Amphibious Force, Atlantic Fleet and transited the Panama Canal to arrive at the vessel's new home port of Little Creek, Virginia. La Moure County alternated between training operations along the east coast of the United States and the Caribbean Sea and active deployments in the Mediterranean Sea and European waters.

During the Gulf War, La Moure County was part of Amphibious Group 2 (PhibGru2). Tasked with transporting part of the 4th Marine Expeditionary Brigade (4th MEB) via the Mediterranean to the Persian Gulf, the group was divided up into transit groups, with La Moure County joining Transit Group 3. (Note: Transit Group 3 was composed of USS Guam, USS Iwo Jima, USS Manitowoc and La Moure County.) Transit Group 3 departed Morehead City, North Carolina on 21 August 1990 and united with the other transit groups off Masirah Island on 16 September. Transit Group 3 rejoined PhibGru2. PhibGru2 was split back into respective transit groups on 24 March 1991 and Transit Group 2 returned to Little Creek on 17 April after a ceasefire had been declared on 1 April. In 1995 the ship was transferred to the Naval Reserve Force.

=== Grounding and aftermath ===
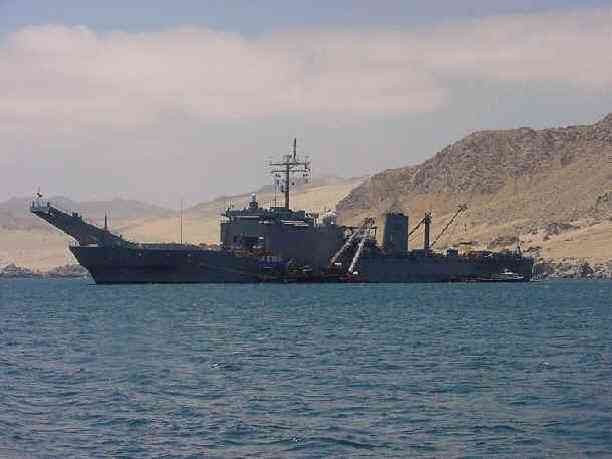
La Moure County at anchor in Cifuncho Bay, where the ship lay from 12 September to 28 October 2000

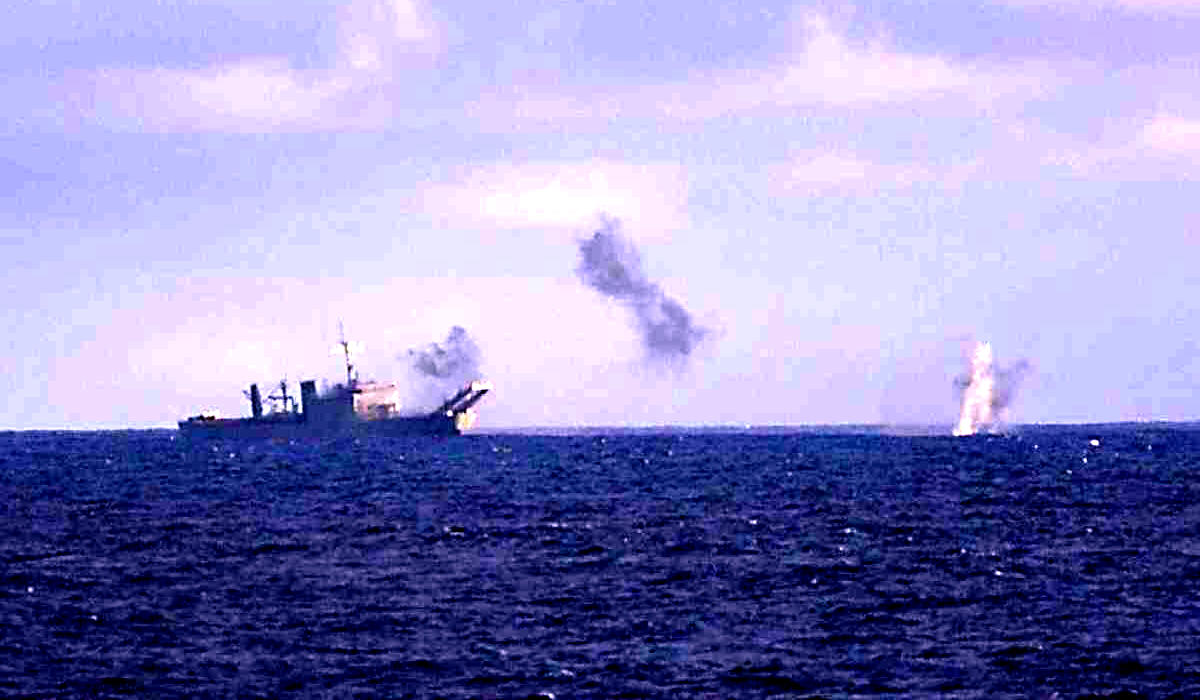
Ex-La Moure County as seen here during the first phase of the SINKEX on 10 July 2001

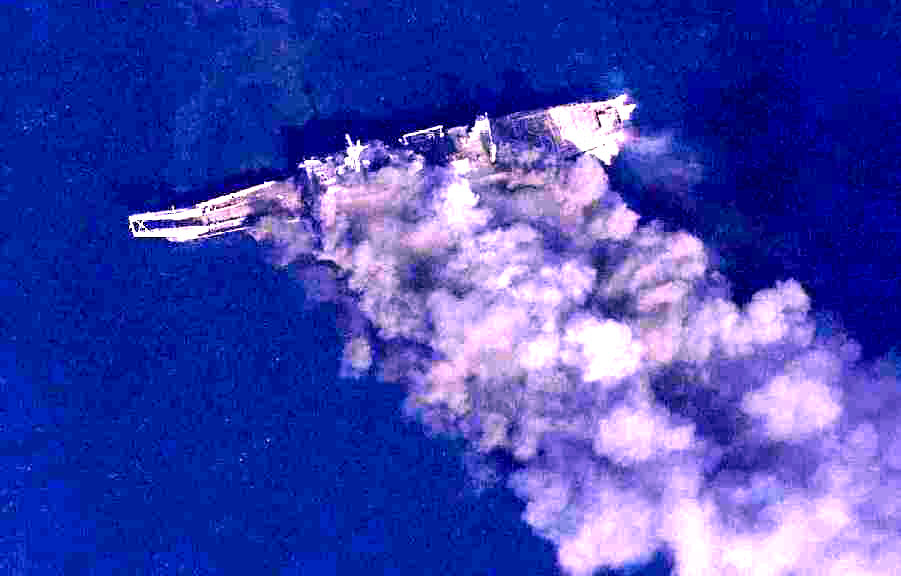
Ex-La Moure County overhead view showing the ship later in the SINKEX exercise, burning after several missile hits

The ship was run aground near the coast of Caleta Cifuncho Bay, Chile, in the pre-dawn hours of 12 September 2000 during a routine amphibious training operation with a sister vessel, the Chilean Navy's Valdivia. A combination of the speed of the ship at impact and the incoming tide resulted in extensive damage to the bow, keel, screws, and rudders. Extensive internal flooding and the dumping of 40,000 US gallons (150,000 L; 33,000 imp gal) of diesel fuel only served to complicate matters. No injuries were suffered by the crew or marines aboard the ship.

Following the grounding, it was found that the captain of the ship had failed to chart his position correctly. This incident led to a complete standdown by all USN vessels to assess their safety and navigation protocols. La Moure County's grounding, along with several navigational mishaps by other USN vessels led to the USN re-assessing its training in navigation. The USN ordered new simulation training for bridge officers.

La Moure County was deemed damaged beyond repair. The ship was decommissioned and struck from the Naval Vessel Register on 17 November 2000. After five weeks of work by divers stabilizing the vessel, La Moure County was towed by the Chilean icebreaker Almirante Óscar Viel to Talcahuano, Chile where further repairs were deemed uneconomical. Having been stripped of all usable material, the damaged hulk of La Moure County was towed out to sea and sunk as a target on 10 July 2001 during UNITAS 2001.
