= USS Newport (LST-1179) =

Newport-class tank landing ship

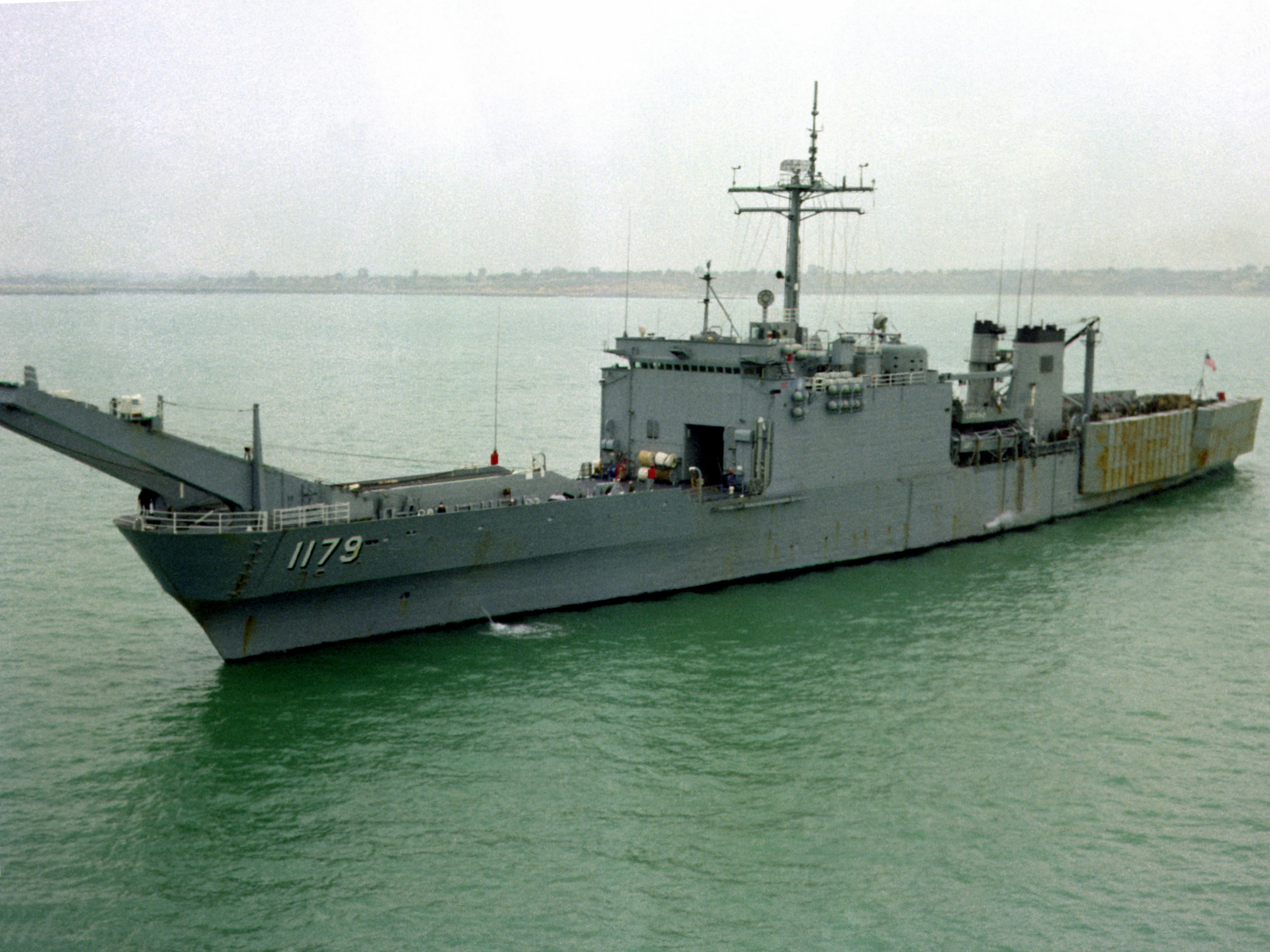
- USS Newport at Rota, Spain in 1982

History

United States
- Name: Newport
- Namesake: Newport, Rhode Island
- Ordered: FY 1965
- Builder: Philadelphia Naval Shipyard, Philadelphia, Pennsylvania
- Laid down: 1 November 1966
- Launched: 3 February 1968
- Commissioned: 7 June 1969
- Decommissioned: 1 October 1992
- Stricken: 13 July 2001
- Identification: LST-1179
- Fate: Transferred to Mexico

Mexico
- Name: Papaloapan
- Acquired: 18 January 2001
- Commissioned: 23 May 2001
- Identification: A 411
- Status: In service

General characteristics as built
- Class & type: Newport-class tank landing ship
- Displacement: 4,793 long tons (4,870 t) light; 8,342 long tons (8,476 t) full load
- Length: 522 ft 4 in (159.2 m) oa; 562 ft (171.3 m) over derrick arms
- Beam: 69 ft 6 in (21.2 m)
- Draft: 17 ft 6 in (5.3 m) max
- Propulsion: 2 shafts; 6 GM diesel engines (3 per shaft); 16,500 shp (12,300 kW); Bow thruster
- Speed: 22 knots (41 km/h; 25 mph) max
- Range: 2,500 nmi (4,600 km; 2,900 mi) at 14 knots (26 km/h; 16 mph)
- Troops: 431 max
- Complement: 213
- Sensors & processing systems: 2 × Mk 63 GCFS; SPS-10 radar
- Armament: 2 × twin 3-inch/50-caliber guns
- Aviation facilities: Helicopter deck

USS Newport (LST-1179) was the third ship of the United States Navy (USN) to bear the name of the Rhode Island city. The first of her class of landing ship tanks (LST), she was capable of a sustained speed of 20 knots (37 km/h; 23 mph). Her ability to adjust her draft, accompanied by her unique bow-ramp design, helped bring a new degree of responsiveness to the amphibious fleet. The ship was launched in 1968 and entered service with the USN in 1969. Assigned to the United States Atlantic Fleet for the entirety of her career, Newport made deployments to the Mediterranean and Caribbean Seas. The vessel was taken out of service in 1992 and laid up until 2001.

In 2001, the ship was sold to the Mexican Navy and initially renamed ARM Sonora before becoming ARM Rio Papaloapan (or just ARM Papaloapan for short). In Mexican service, the LST has participated in humanitarian missions in the aftermath of the hurricanes Katrina and Sandy and taken part in multi-national naval exercises.

== Description ==
Newport was the first of her class which were designed to meet the goal put forward by the United States amphibious forces to have a tank landing ship (LST) capable of over 20 knots (37 km/h; 23 mph). However, the traditional bow door form for LSTs would not be capable. Therefore, the designers of the Newport class came up with a design of a traditional ship hull with a 112-foot (34 m) aluminum ramp slung over the bow supported by two derrick arms. The 34-long-ton (35 t) ramp was capable of sustaining loads up to 75 long tons (76 t). This made the Newport class the first to depart from the standard LST design that had been developed in early World War II.

Newport had a displacement of 4,793 long tons (4,870 t) when light and 8,342 long tons (8,476 t) at full load. The LST was 522 feet 4 inches (159.2 m) long overall and 562 ft (171.3 m) over the derrick arms which protruded past the bow. The vessel had a beam of 69 ft 6 in (21.2 m), a draft forward of 11 ft 5 in (3.5 m) and 17 ft 5 in (5.3 m) at the stern at full load.

Newport was fitted with six General Motors 16-645-ES diesel engines turning two shafts, three to each shaft. The system was rated at 16,500 brake horsepower (12,300 kW) and gave the ship a maximum speed of 22 knots (41 km/h; 25 mph) for short periods and could only sustain 20 knots (37 km/h; 23 mph) for an extended length of time. The LST carried 1,750 long tons (1,778 t) of diesel fuel for a range of 2,500 nautical miles (4,600 km; 2,900 mi) at the cruising speed of 14 knots (26 km/h; 16 mph). The ship was also equipped with a bow thruster to allow for better maneuvering near causeways and to hold position while offshore during the unloading of amphibious vehicles.

The Newport class were larger and faster than previous LSTs and were able to transport tanks, heavy vehicles and engineer groups and supplies that were too large for helicopters or smaller landing craft to carry. The LSTs have a ramp forward of the superstructure that connects the lower tank deck with the main deck and a passage large enough to allow access to the parking area amidships. The vessels are also equipped with a stern gate to allow the unloading of amphibious vehicles directly into the water or to unload onto a utility landing craft (LCU) or pier. At either end of the tank deck there is a 30 ft (9.1 m) turntable that permits vehicles to turn around without having to reverse. The Newport class has the capacity for 500 long tons (508 t) of vehicles, 19,000 ft^{2} (1,800 m^{2}) of cargo area and could carry up to 431 troops. The vessels also have davits for four vehicle and personnel landing craft (LCVPs) and could carry four pontoon causeway sections along the sides of the hull.

Newport was initially armed with four Mark 33 3-inch (76 mm)/50 caliber guns in two twin turrets. The vessel was equipped with two Mk 63 gun control fire systems (GCFS) for the 3-inch guns, but these were removed in 1977–1978. The ship also had SPS-10 surface search radar. Atop the stern gate, the vessels mounted a helicopter deck. They had a maximum complement of 213 including 11 officers.

== Construction and career ==
=== United States Navy service ===
Newport's ship patch

The vessel was ordered as part of Fiscal Year 1965 from the Philadelphia Naval Shipyard of Philadelphia, Pennsylvania. The ship's keel was laid down on 1 November 1966 and the vessel was launched on 3 February 1968, sponsored by Nuella Pell, wife of Rhode Island Senator Claiborne Pell. Newport, named for the city in Rhode Island, was commissioned into the United States Navy on 7 June 1969.

Upon entering service, Newport was assigned to the Atlantic Fleet as part of the amphibious force. The vessel was deployed in the Mediterranean and Caribbean Seas along with training operations along the United States East Coast. The development of the landing craft air cushion, which allowed the United States Navy to launch over-the-horizon amphibious landings, made the Newport class obsolete. USS Newport was decommissioned on 1 October 1992.

=== Mexican Navy service ===
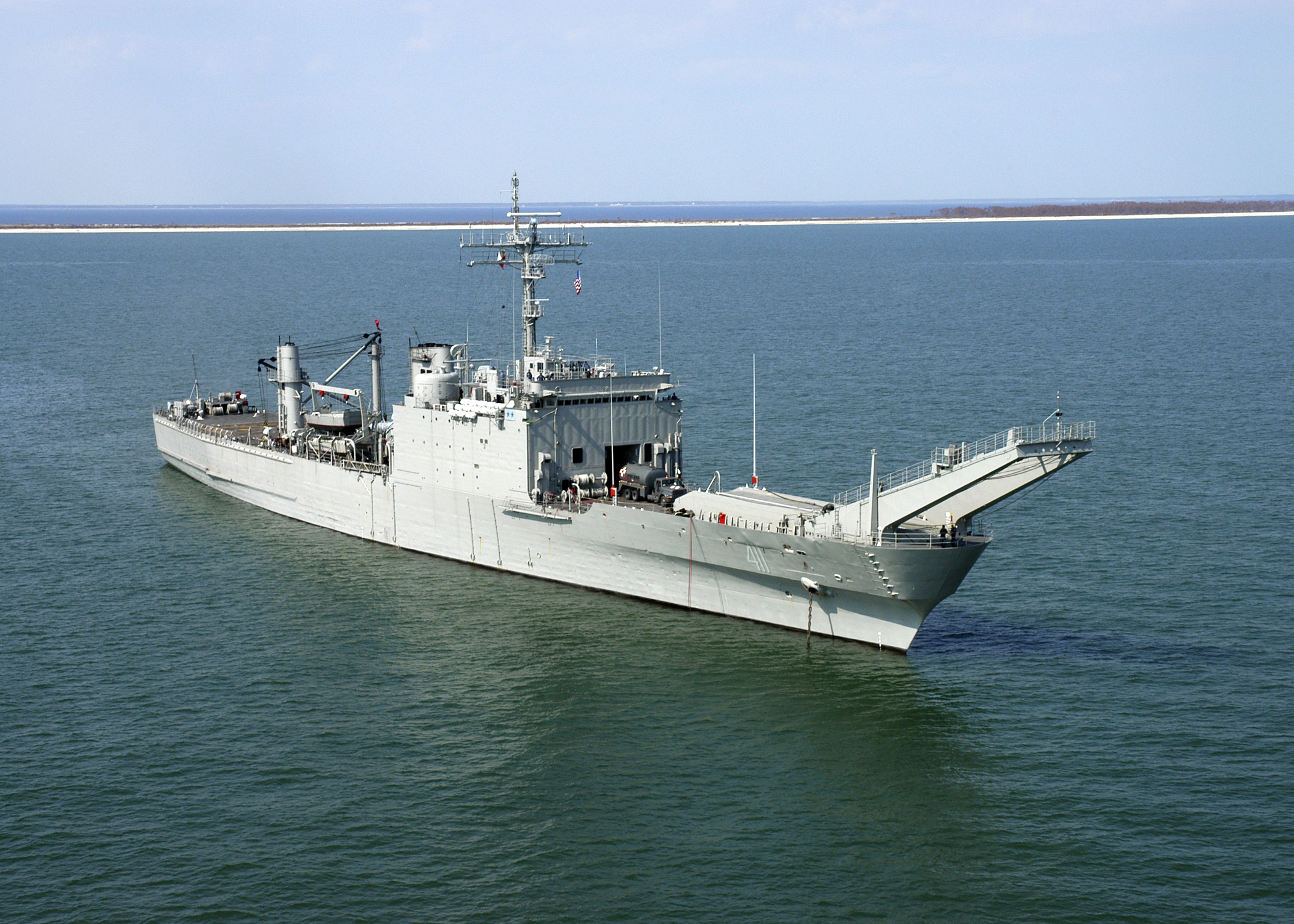
ARM Papaloapan off the coast of Mississippi after Hurricane Katrina

After several years laid up Newport was sold to the Mexican Navy on 18 January 2001 as part of the Security Assistance Program in a cash sale and renamed Sonora (A-04). On 23 May 2001, the vessel joined the Mexican Navy and was renamed ARM Rio Papaloapan or Papaloapan (A 411). The vessel was stricken from the United States Naval Vessel Register on 13 July 2001.

In late 2005, ARM Papaloapan brought aid and supplies to Mississippi after Hurricane Katrina hit the state, with her crew taking part in cleanup efforts near Biloxi. In January 2010, she was deployed with 5,000 tons of cargo in a humanitarian mission to Haiti. In November 2012, she was sent to Cuba with supplies to help the victims of Hurricane Sandy after the hurricane caused severe damage to the island.

In 2015, Papaloapan participated in the multi-national naval exercise UNITAS. In 2017, the ship took part in the multi-national naval exercise Bold Alligator on the US East Coast. In 2018, the ship took part in another multi-national naval exercise, Panamax 2018, off the coast of the United States.
