= USS Boulder =

Newport-class tank landing ship

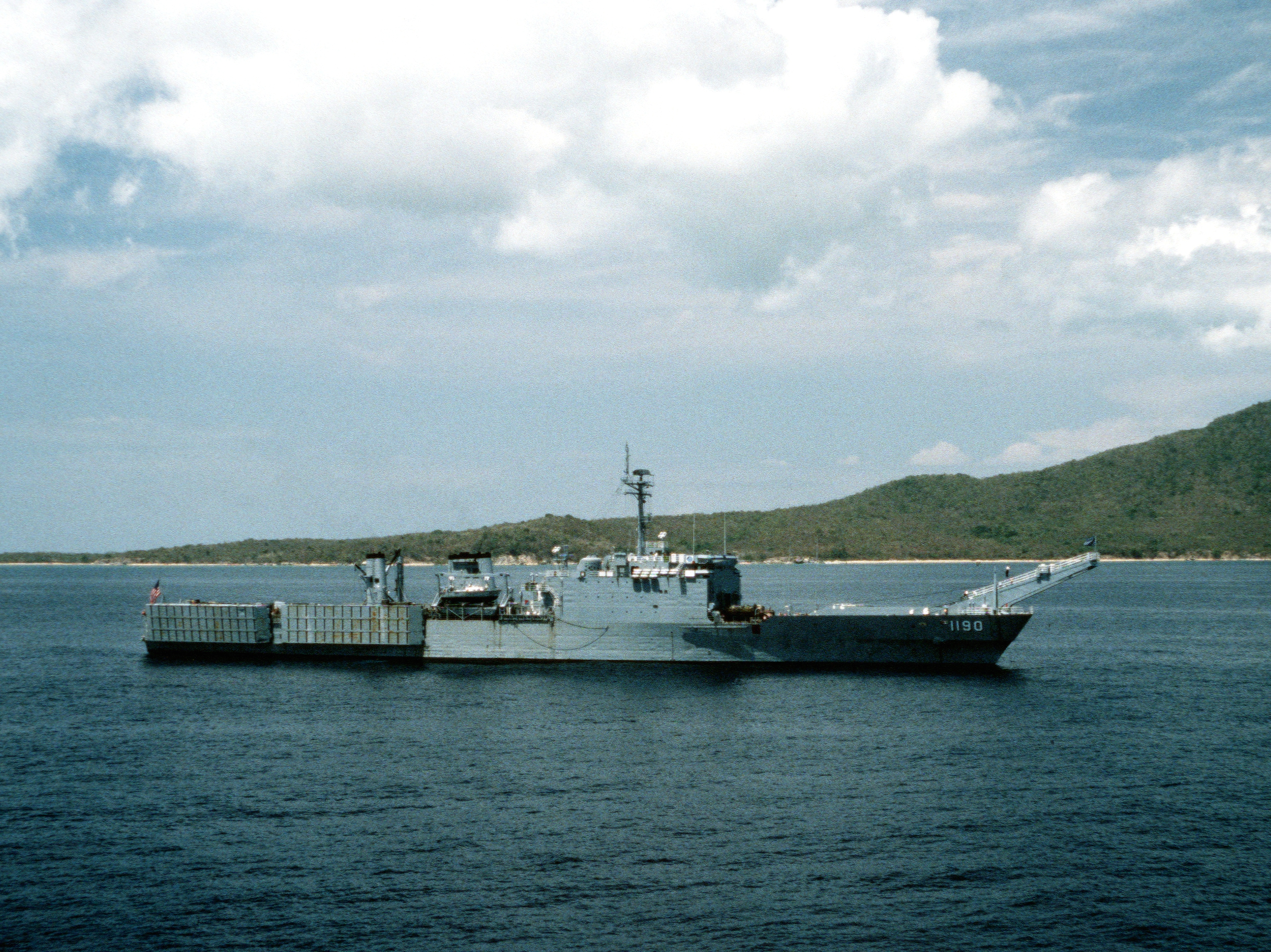
- USS Boulder off Puerto Rico on 30 March 1988

History

United States
- Name: USS Boulder
- Namesake: Boulder County, Colorado
- Ordered: 15 July 1966
- Builder: National Steel and Shipbuilding Company, San Diego, California
- Laid down: 6 September 1969
- Launched: 22 May 1970
- Commissioned: 4 June 1971
- Decommissioned: 28 February 1994
- Stricken: 1 December 2008
- Fate: Scrapped

General characteristics as built
- Class & type: Newport-class tank landing ship
- Displacement: 4,793 long tons (4,870 t) light; 8,342 long tons (8,476 t) full load
- Length: 522 ft 4 in (159.2 m) oa; 562 ft (171.3 m) over derrick arms
- Beam: 69 ft 6 in (21.2 m)
- Draft: 17 ft 6 in (5.3 m) max
- Propulsion: 2 shafts; 6 Alco diesel engines (3 per shaft); 16,500 shp (12,300 kW); Bow thruster
- Speed: 22 knots (41 km/h; 25 mph) max
- Range: 2,500 nmi (4,600 km; 2,900 mi) at 14 knots (26 km/h; 16 mph)
- Troops: 431 max
- Complement: 213
- Sensors & processing systems: 2 × Mk 63 GCFS; SPS-10 radar
- Armament: 2 × twin 3"/50 caliber guns
- Aviation facilities: Helicopter deck

USS Boulder (LST-1190) was the twelfth of twenty Newport-class tank landing ships of the United States Navy (USN) which replaced the traditional bow door-design tank landing ships (LSTs). Named after the county in Colorado, the ship was constructed by National Steel and Shipbuilding Company of San Diego, California. The LST was launched in 1970 and was commissioned in 1971. Boulder was assigned to the United States Atlantic Fleet and deployed in the Caribbean and Mediterranean Seas. In 1980, the ship was transferred to the Naval Reserve Force. In 1988, Boulder ran aground off Norway during a military exercise. The vessel was decommissioned in 1994 and laid up at the Naval Inactive Ship Maintenance Facility in Philadelphia, Pennsylvania. The ship was struck from the Naval Vessel Register in 2008 and towed to Brownsville, Texas for scrapping in 2022.

== Design and description ==
Boulder was a Newport-class tank landing ship which were designed to meet the goal put forward by the United States amphibious forces to have a tank landing ship (LST) capable of over 20 knots (37 km/h; 23 mph). However, the traditional bow door form for LSTs would not be capable. Therefore, the designers of the Newport class came up with a design of a traditional ship hull with a 112-foot (34 m) aluminum ramp slung over the bow supported by two derrick arms. The 34-long-ton (35 t) ramp was capable of sustaining loads up to 75 long tons (76 t). This made the Newport class the first to depart from the standard LST design that had been developed in early World War II.

The LST had a displacement of 4,793 long tons (4,870 t) when light and 8,342 long tons (8,476 t) at full load. Boulder was 522 feet 4 inches (159.2 m) long overall and 562 ft (171.3 m) over the derrick arms which protruded past the bow. The vessel had a beam of 69 ft 6 in (21.2 m), a draft forward of 11 ft 5 in (3.5 m) and 17 ft 5 in (5.3 m) at the stern at full load.

Boulder was fitted with six Alco 16-645-ES diesel engines turning two shafts, three to each shaft. The system was rated at 16,500 brake horsepower (12,300 kW) and gave the ship a maximum speed of 22 knots (41 km/h; 25 mph) for short periods and could only sustain 20 knots (37 km/h; 23 mph) for an extended length of time. The LST carried 1,750 long tons (1,780 t) of diesel fuel for a range of 2,500 nautical miles (4,600 km; 2,900 mi) at the cruising speed of 14 knots (26 km/h; 16 mph). The ship was also equipped with a bow thruster to allow for better maneuvering near causeways and to hold position while offshore during the unloading of amphibious vehicles.

The Newport class were larger and faster than previous LSTs and were able to transport tanks, heavy vehicles and engineer groups and supplies that were too large for helicopters or smaller landing craft to carry. The LSTs have a ramp forward of the superstructure that connects the lower tank deck with the main deck and a passage large enough to allow access to the parking area amidships. The vessels are also equipped with a stern gate to allow the unloading of amphibious vehicles directly into the water or to unload onto a utility landing craft (LCU) or pier. At either end of the tank deck there is a 30 ft (9.1 m) turntable that permits vehicles to turn around without having to reverse. The Newport class has the capacity for 500 long tons (510 t) of vehicles, 19,000 ft^{2} (1,800 m^{2}) of cargo area and could carry up to 431 troops. The vessels also have davits for four vehicle and personnel landing craft (LCVPs) and could carry four pontoon causeway sections along the sides of the hull.

Boulder was initially armed with four Mark 33 3-inch (76 mm)/50 caliber guns in two twin turrets. The vessel was equipped with two Mk 63 gun control fire systems (GCFS) for the 3-inch guns, but these were removed in 1977–1978. The ship also had SPS-10 surface search radar. Atop the stern gate, the vessels mounted a helicopter deck. They had a maximum complement of 213 including 11 officers.

== Construction and career ==
The LST was ordered as the third hull of the third group in Fiscal Year 1967 and a contract was awarded on 15 July 1966. The ship was laid down on 6 September 1969 at San Diego, by the National Steel and Shipbuilding Company. Named for a county in Colorado, Boulder was launched on 22 April 1970, sponsored by the wife of Senator Gordon L. Allott. The LST was commissioned on 4 June 1971 at Long Beach, California and assigned to the Amphibious Force, Atlantic Fleet, with the home port of Little Creek, Virginia.

Into 1980, Boulder alternated amphibious training operations along the east coast of the United States and in the Caribbean Sea with regular, extended deployments to the Mediterranean Sea. On 1 December 1980, the LST was transferred to the Naval Reserve Force. Boulder was awarded the Meritorious Unit Commendation for removal and disposal of ordnance from the Suez Canal in 1974. On 13 September 1988, Boulder ran aground on a shoal northeast of Frøya in a Norwegian fjord during the NATO military exercise Teamwork '88. During the grounding, 880 US gallons (3,300 L; 730 imp gal) of diesel oil spilled from the LST. A Norwegian tugboat was dispatched to help dislodge Boulder.

A stitch of several photos taken at the Philadelphia Navy Yard in February 2019 of Boulder

Boulder was decommissioned on 28 February 1994 and was placed in inactive reserve at the Naval Inactive Ship Maintenance Facility (NISMF) in Philadelphia, Pennsylvania. On 1 December 2008 she was struck from the Naval Vessel Register. On 16 March 2022, Boulder was removed from the Philadelphia NIMSF. The vessel was towed to Brownsville, Texas, where the ship was scrapped.

== See also ==
- SS Boulder Victory
