= USS Sumter (LST-1181) =

Newport-class tank landing ship

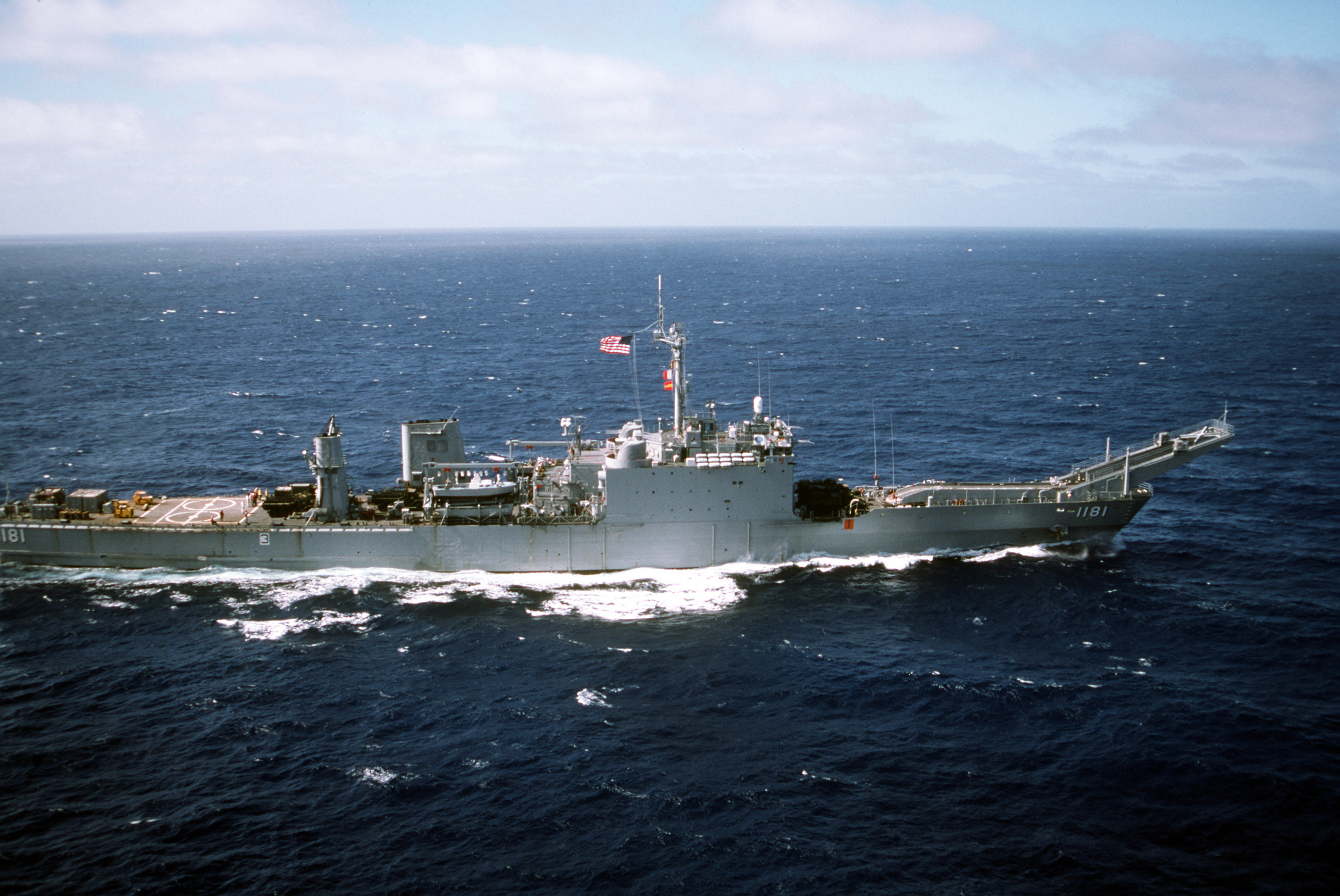
- USS Sumter (LST-1181)

History

United States
- Name: USS Sumter
- Namesake: Sumter, South Carolina
- Ordered: 29 December 1965
- Builder: Philadelphia Naval Shipyard, Philadelphia, Pennsylvania
- Laid down: 14 November 1967
- Launched: 13 December 1969
- Commissioned: 20 June 1970
- Decommissioned: 30 September 1993
- Stricken: 23 July 2002
- Identification: LST-1181
- Fate: Transferred to Taiwan through the Security Assistance Program (SAP), 29 September 2000
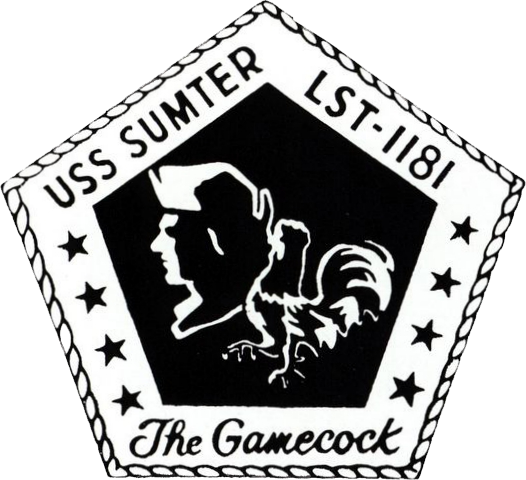
- Badge

Taiwan
- Name: ROCS Chung Ping
- Acquired: 29 September 2000
- Commissioned: 8 May 1997
- Identification: LST-233
- Status: In service

General characteristics as built
- Class & type: Newport-class tank landing ship
- Displacement: 4,793 long tons (4,870 t) light; 8,342 long tons (8,476 t) full load
- Length: 522 ft 4 in (159.2 m) oa; 562 ft (171.3 m) over derrick arms
- Beam: 69 ft 6 in (21.2 m)
- Draft: 17 ft 6 in (5.3 m) max
- Propulsion: 2 shafts; 6 GM diesel engines (3 per shaft); 16,500 shp (12,300 kW); Bow thruster
- Speed: 22 knots (41 km/h; 25 mph) max
- Range: 2,500 nmi (4,600 km; 2,900 mi) at 14 knots (26 km/h; 16 mph)
- Troops: 431 max
- Complement: 213
- Sensors & processing systems: 2 × Mk 63 GCFS; SPS-10 radar
- Armament: 2 × twin 3-inch/50-caliber guns
- Aviation facilities: Helicopter deck

USS Sumter (LST-1181) was the third of twenty Newport-class tank landing ships in service with the United States Navy, which replaced the traditional bow door-design tank landing ships (LSTs). Sumter was constructed by Philadelphia Naval Shipyard in Philadelphia, Pennsylvania and was launched in 1969. The ship entered service in 1970, was assigned to the Pacific coast of the United States and deployed to the western Pacific twice during the Vietnam War. In 1973, Sumter was reassigned to the Atlantic coast and took part in operations in along the Eastern Seaboard of the United States, the Mediterranean Sea and the Caribbean Sea. The LST was decommissioned in 1993.

In 1995, Sumter was acquired on loan by the Republic of China Navy (ROCN). The vessel was taken to Newport News Shipbuilding to be refitted before re-commissioning into the ROCN in 1997 as ROCS Chung Ping. The LST was acquired outright in 2000 and remains in active service.

== Description ==
Sumter was the third of the Newport class which were designed to meet the goal put forward by the United States amphibious forces to have a tank landing ship (LST) capable of over 20 knots (37 km/h; 23 mph). However, the traditional bow door form for LSTs would not be capable. Therefore, the designers of the Newport class came up with a design of a traditional ship hull with a 112-foot (34 m) aluminum ramp slung over the bow supported by two derrick arms. The 34-long-ton (35 t) ramp was capable of sustaining loads up to 75 long tons (76 t). This made the Newport class the first to depart from the standard LST design that had been developed in early World War II.

Sumter had a displacement of 4,793 long tons (4,870 t) when light and 8,342 long tons (8,476 t) at full load. The LST was 522 feet 4 inches (159.2 m) long overall and 562 ft (171.3 m) over the derrick arms which protruded past the bow. The vessel had a beam of 69 ft 6 in (21.2 m), a draft forward of 11 ft 5 in (3.5 m) and 17 ft 5 in (5.3 m) at the stern at full load.

Sumter was fitted with six General Motors 16-645-ES diesel engines turning two shafts, three to each shaft. The system was rated at 16,500 brake horsepower (12,300 kW) and gave the ship a maximum speed of 22 knots (41 km/h; 25 mph) for short periods and could only sustain 20 knots (37 km/h; 23 mph) for an extended length of time. The LST carried 1,750 long tons (1,780 t) of diesel fuel for a range of 2,500 nautical miles (4,600 km; 2,900 mi) at the cruising speed of 14 knots (26 km/h; 16 mph). The ship was also equipped with a bow thruster to allow for better maneuvering near causeways and to hold position while offshore during the unloading of amphibious vehicles.

The Newport class were larger and faster than previous LSTs and were able to transport tanks, heavy vehicles and engineer groups and supplies that were too large for helicopters or smaller landing craft to carry. The LSTs have a ramp forward of the superstructure that connects the lower tank deck with the main deck and a passage large enough to allow access to the parking area amidships. The vessels are also equipped with a stern gate to allow the unloading of amphibious vehicles directly into the water or to unload onto a utility landing craft (LCU) or pier. At either end of the tank deck there is a 30 ft (9.1 m) turntable that permits vehicles to turn around without having to reverse. The Newport class has the capacity for 500 long tons (510 t) of vehicles, 19,000 ft^{2} (1,800 m^{2}) of cargo area and could carry up to 431 troops. The vessels also have davits for four vehicle and personnel landing craft (LCVPs) and could carry four pontoon causeway sections along the sides of the hull.

Sumter was initially armed with four Mark 33 3-inch (76 mm)/50 caliber guns in two twin turrets. The vessel was equipped with two Mk 63 gun control fire systems (GCFS) for the 3-inch guns, but these were removed in 1977–1978. The ship also had SPS-10 surface search radar. Atop the stern gate, the vessels mounted a helicopter deck. They had a maximum complement of 213 including 11 officers.

== Construction and career ==
=== United States Navy service ===
The third ship of the class was ordered as part of the second group in Fiscal Year 1966. The LST was laid down on 14 November 1967 by the Philadelphia Naval Shipyard in Philadelphia, Pennsylvania, the last Newport-class ship to be constructed there. Named for the county in South Carolina, Sumter was launched on 13 December 1969, sponsored by the wife of United States Senator Strom Thurmond. The vessel was commissioned on 20 June 1970.

Sumter performed sea trials in the Virginia Capes area. The ship was assigned to the Pacific and on 21 August Sumter got underway for the Panama Canal making a stop in Montego Bay, Jamaica, before transiting the canal on 7 September 1970. Pausing at Acapulco, Mexico, the LST arrived at her homeport of Long Beach, California. Sumter operated along the California coast until 30 April 1971 when the LST was deployed to 7th Fleet in the western Pacific. Sumter returned to Long Beach on 18 June. In July and August the LST made a cruise to British Columbia, followed by local operations off California. Sumter had a restricted availability period at the Todd Shipyard in San Pedro from 21 November 1971 until 7 January 1972. The ship continued local operations until deploying to the western Pacific on 31 March, for a tour that did not end until 6 December 1972. Sumter then returned to Long Beach for an upkeep period.

Sumter sailed from Long Beach, on 6 January 1973, for the east coast of the United States. The ship transited the Panama Canal on 19 January and arrived at Little Creek, Virginia, her new home port, on 29 January. The following six months were spent in periods of upkeep and independent steaming cruises. On 29 August, Sumter sailed to Morehead City, North Carolina, where the LST embarked Marines, and then steamed to join the 6th Fleet in the Mediterranean Sea. Sumter called at ports in Spain, Turkey, Sardinia, Sicily, Italy, Crete, and Greece before returning to Little Creek on 10 December 1973. On 12 February 1974, Sumter sailed to Morehead City to embark Marines for exercises in the Caribbean Sea and returned to Little Creek on 8 March. In April the LST made a voyage to Boston and, the following month, held additional exercises in the Caribbean before returning to her homeport on 3 July. Sumter sailed from Little Creek, on 16 August 1974, en route to the Mediterranean and a second tour with the 6th Fleet into 1975. Sumter earned two engagement stars for service in the Vietnam War. The LST continued to alternate operations between the east coast of the United States and deployments in the Caribbean and Mediterranean into 1978.

17 August 1986 Sumter sortied to embark Marines at Morehead City to begin the first phase of Deployment Northern Wedding 1986. On 28 August the ship crossed the Arctic Circle en route to the Norwegian fjords. This cruise continued with visits or transits of Norway, Scotland, Denmark, Germany, Netherlands, England, Portugal, Spain, Morocco, Eastern Mediterranean, Sicily, Italy, France and Spain. The LST was decommissioned on 30 September 1993.

=== Republic of China Navy service ===
Sumter was leased by the Republic of China Navy (ROCN) on 1 July 1995 and sent to Newport News Shipbuilding for a refit. There the vessel's main armament of 3-inch guns were removed and replaced with two twin Bofors 40 mm (1.6 in)/60 gun mounts. Cheng Feng III electronic countermeasures, WD 2A electronic warfare support measures and SPS-67 surface search radar. The LST was renamed Chung Ping and recommissioned into the ROCN on 8 May 1997. The ship was acquired by the Republic of China outright through the Security Assistance Program on 29 September 2000. The vessel was struck from the United States Naval Vessel Register on 23 July 2002.
