= USS Peoria (LST-1183) =

Newport-class tank landing ship

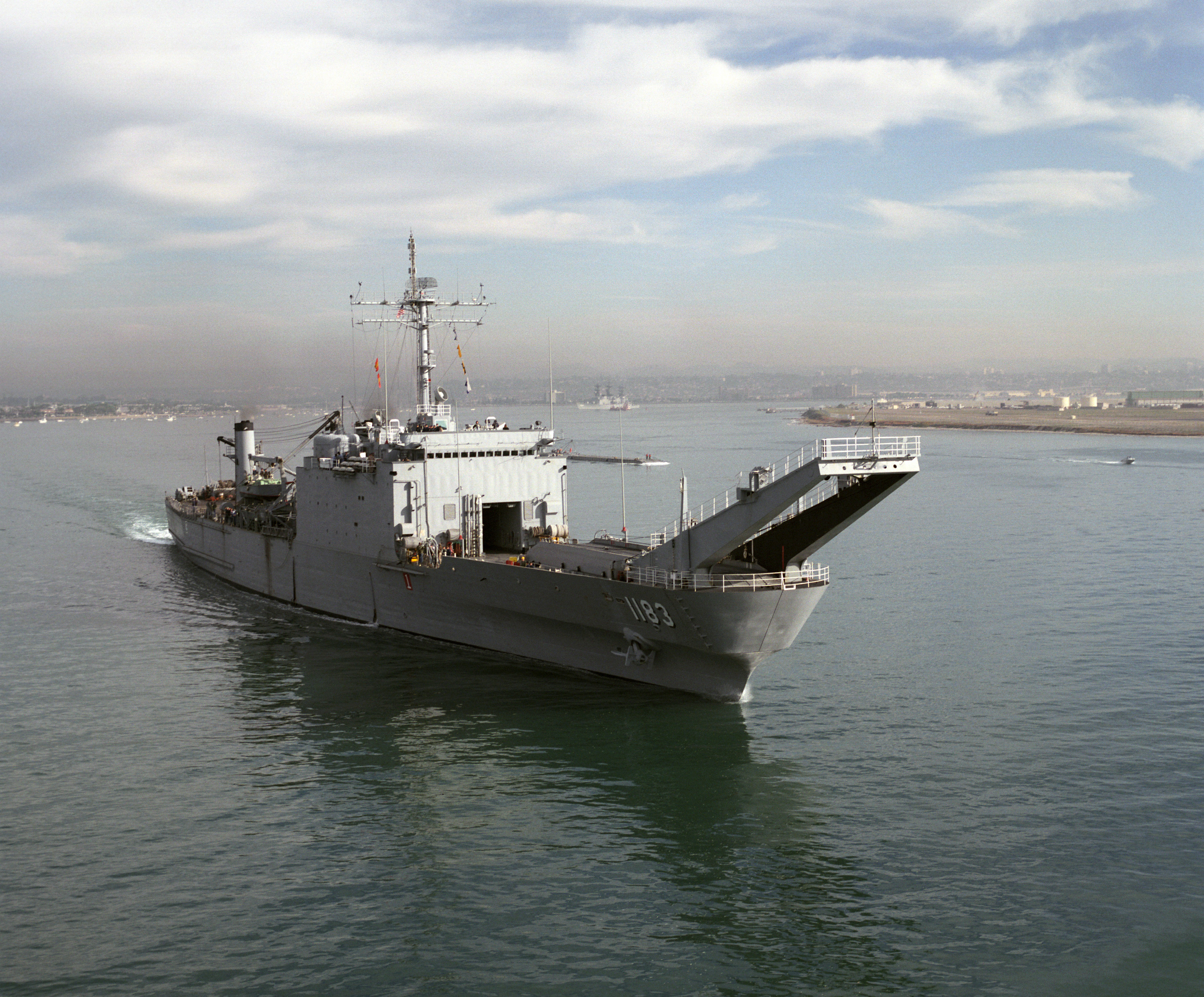
- USS Peoria (LST-1183)

History

United States
- Name: Peoria
- Namesake: Peoria, Illinois
- Ordered: 1966
- Builder: National Steel and Shipbuilding Company, San Diego, California
- Laid down: 24 February 1968
- Launched: 23 November 1968
- Acquired: 1 January 1970
- Commissioned: 21 February 1970
- Decommissioned: 28 January 1994
- Identification: LST-1183
- Fate: Sunk as target, 12 July 2004

General characteristics as built
- Class & type: Newport-class tank landing ship
- Displacement: 4,793 long tons (4,870 t) light; 8,342 long tons (8,476 t) full load
- Length: 522 ft 4 in (159.2 m) oa; 562 ft (171.3 m) over derrick arms
- Beam: 69 ft 6 in (21.2 m)
- Draft: 17 ft 6 in (5.3 m) max
- Propulsion: 2 shafts; 6 Alco diesel engines (3 per shaft); 16,500 shp (12,300 kW); Bow thruster
- Speed: 22 knots (41 km/h; 25 mph) max
- Range: 2,500 nmi (4,600 km; 2,900 mi) at 14 knots (26 km/h; 16 mph)
- Troops: 431 max
- Complement: 213
- Sensors & processing systems: 2 × Mk 63 GCFS; SPS-10 radar
- Armament: 2 × twin 3"/50 caliber guns
- Aviation facilities: Helicopter deck

USS Peoria (LST-1183) was a Newport-class tank landing ship which replaced the traditional bow door-design tank landing ships (LSTs). The vessel took part in the Vietnam War and Gulf War. The ship was constructed by the National Steel and Shipbuilding Company in San Diego, California and was launched in 1968 and commissioned in 1970. Named for a city in Illinois, Peoria was assigned to the United States Pacific Fleet and home ported at San Diego. The tank landing ship alternated between military exercises along the United States west coast and deployments to the western Pacific. Peoria took part in the evacuations of Phnom Penh, Cambodia and Saigon, South Vietnam, both of which signaled the end of American involvement in the respective countries. The vessel was decommissioned 1994 and sunk as a target ship during a RIMPAC naval exercise in 2004.

== Design and description ==
Peoria was a Newport-class tank landing ship which were designed to meet the goal put forward by the United States amphibious forces to have a tank landing ship (LST) capable of over 20 knots (37 km/h; 23 mph). However, the traditional bow door form for LSTs would not be capable. Therefore, the designers of the Newport class came up with a design of a traditional ship hull with a 112-foot (34 m) aluminum ramp slung over the bow supported by two derrick arms. The 34-long-ton (35 t) ramp was capable of sustaining loads up to 75 long tons (76 t). This made the Newport class the first to depart from the standard LST design that had been developed in early World War II.

Peoria had a displacement of 4,793 long tons (4,870 t) when light and 8,342 long tons (8,476 t) at full load. The LST was 522 feet 4 inches (159.2 m) long overall and 562 ft (171.3 m) over the derrick arms which protruded past the bow. The vessel had a beam of 69 ft 6 in (21.2 m), a draft forward of 11 ft 5 in (3.5 m) and 17 ft 5 in (5.3 m) at the stern at full load.

Peoria was fitted with six Alco 16-645-ES diesel engines turning two shafts, three to each shaft. The system was rated at 16,500 brake horsepower (12,300 kW) and gave the ship a maximum speed of 22 knots (41 km/h; 25 mph) for short periods and could only sustain 20 knots (37 km/h; 23 mph) for an extended length of time. The LST carried 1,750 long tons (1,780 t) of diesel fuel for a range of 2,500 nautical miles (4,600 km; 2,900 mi) at the cruising speed of 14 knots (26 km/h; 16 mph). The ship was also equipped with a bow thruster to allow for better maneuvering near causeways and to hold position while offshore during the unloading of amphibious vehicles.

The Newport class were larger and faster than previous LSTs and were able to transport tanks, heavy vehicles and engineer groups and supplies that were too large for helicopters or smaller landing craft to carry. The LSTs have a ramp forward of the superstructure that connects the lower tank deck with the main deck and a passage large enough to allow access to the parking area amidships. The vessels are also equipped with a stern gate to allow the unloading of amphibious vehicles directly into the water or to unload onto a utility landing craft (LCU) or pier. At either end of the tank deck there is a 30 ft (9.1 m) turntable that permits vehicles to turn around without having to reverse. The Newport class has the capacity for 500 long tons (510 t) of vehicles, 19,000 ft^{2} (1,800 m^{2}) of cargo area and could carry up to 431 troops. The vessels also have davits for four vehicle and personnel landing craft (LCVPs) and could carry four pontoon causeway sections along the sides of the hull.

Peoria was initially armed with four Mark 33 3-inch (76 mm)/50 caliber guns in two twin turrets. The vessel was equipped with two Mk 63 gun control fire systems (GCFS) for the 3-inch guns, but these were removed in 1977–1978. The ship also had SPS-10 surface search radar. Atop the stern gate, the vessels mounted a helicopter deck. They had a maximum complement of 213 including 11 officers.

== Construction and career ==
The LST was ordered as part of the Fiscal Year 1966 group on 15 July 1966 and laid down on 22 February 1968 by the National Steel and Shipbuilding Company at their yard in San Diego, California. The ship was named for the city in Illinois and was launched on 23 November 1968, sponsored by the wife of Congressman Robert H. Michel. The ship was commissioned into the United States Navy on 21 February 1970. The ship was assigned to the Amphibious Force, Pacific Fleet and home ported at San Diego.

Peoria alternated between training exercises along the west coast of the United States and off Hawaii with deployments to the western Pacific. The ship was deployed to Vietnam in 1971 as part of the Vietnam War. In January 1975, Peoria, operating with the amphibious ready group (ARG) Alpha in the western Pacific, was deployed to east Asian waters in preparation for the possible fall of the US-backed government in Cambodia. On 2 February, Peoria was detached from ARG Alpha with a Marine Corps unit to take part in a military exercise on Tinian. By the end of February, Peoria was heading for Subic Bay, Philippines to rejoin the ARG. With the situation in Cambodia worsening for the American-backed government, the US planned for the evacuation of Phnom Penh, Cambodia, dubbed Operation Eagle Pull. ARG Alpha, supporting the operation, remained at sea for over a month and supported the evacuation on 12 April 1975. This was followed by Operation Frequent Wind, the evacuation of Saigon, South Vietnam, on 29–30 April in which Peoria's helicopter deck was one of the launch points of the mission. The ship earned two battle stars for its service in Vietnam.

As part of Amphibious Group 3, Peoria was among the ships designated to carry the 5th Marine Expeditionary Brigade (5th MEB) to the Persian Gulf during the Gulf War. The fleet departed the West Coast on 1 December 1990, making its way to the Persian Gulf via Hawaii, the Philippines, arriving in the Arabian Sea on 14 January 1991. Peoria remained in the gulf until July as part of the Marines' afloat reserve.

Peoria was decommissioned on 28 January 1994 and laid up. The ship was struck from the Naval Vessel Register on 6 November 2002. Peoria was sunk as a target ship on 12 July 2004 in the Pacific Ocean near Hawaii during the RIMPAC 04 exercise.
