= USS Harlan County =

Newport-class tank landing ship

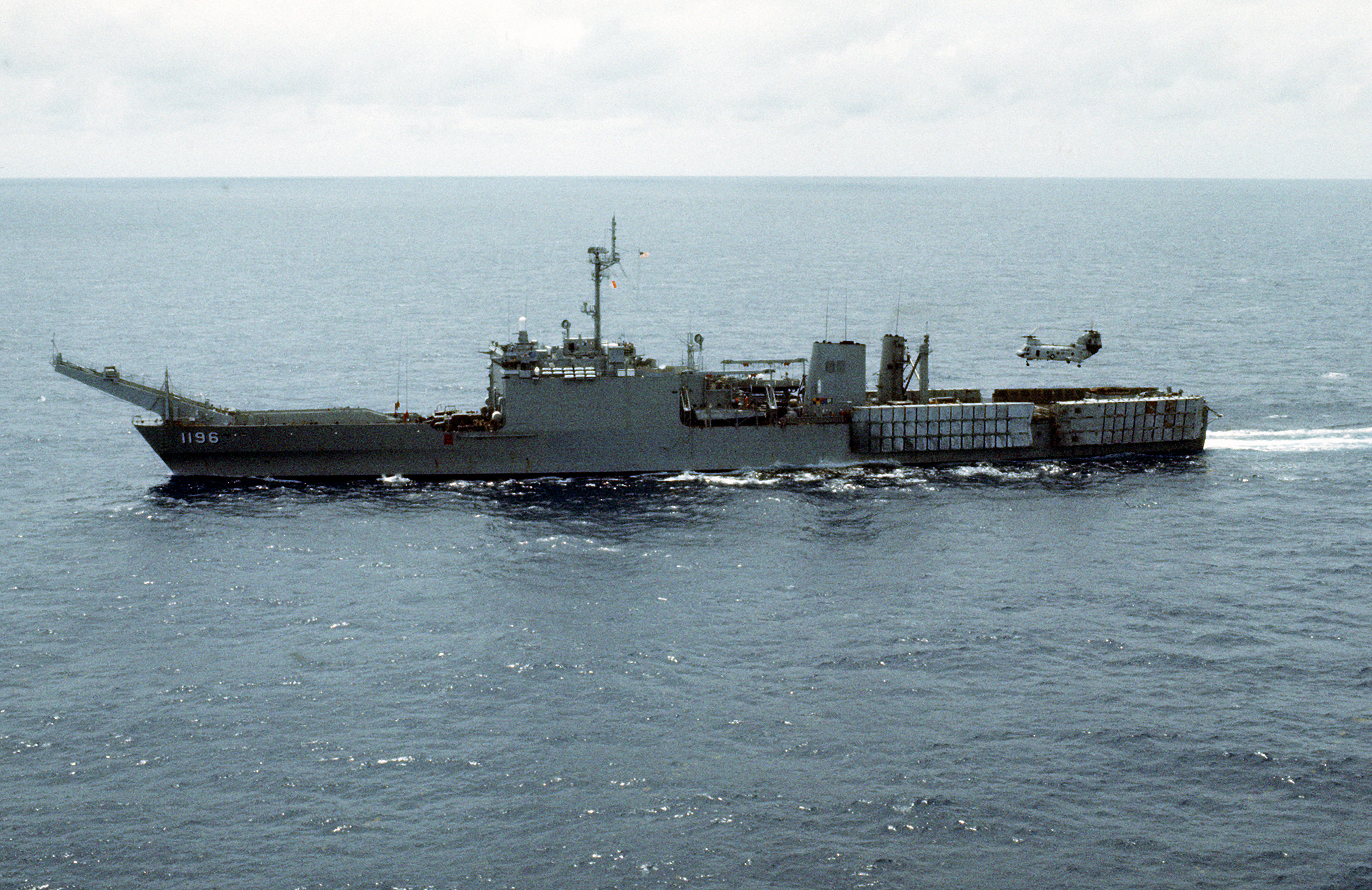
- USS Harlan County

History

United States
- Name: USS Harlan County
- Namesake: Harlan County
- Awarded: 15 July 1966
- Builder: National Steel and Shipbuilding Company, San Diego, California
- Laid down: 7 November 1970
- Launched: 24 July 1971
- Commissioned: 8 April 1972
- Decommissioned: 14 April 1995
- Stricken: 23 July 2002
- Identification: LST-1196
- Motto: Swift and Sure, United We Sail
- Fate: Sold to Spain, 27 April 2000

Spain
- Name: Pizarro
- Namesake: Francisco Pizarro
- Acquired: 27 April 2000
- Decommissioned: 14 December 2012
- Identification: L42
- Fate: Sold for scrap, April 2016

General characteristics
- Class & type: Newport-class tank landing ship
- Displacement: 4,793 long tons (4,870 t) light; 8,500 long tons (8,636 t) full load
- Length: 522 ft (159 m)
- Beam: 70 ft (21 m)
- Draft: 17 ft 4 in (5.28 m)
- Installed power: 3 ALCO/GE generators (750 kW, 1201 A each)
- Propulsion: 6 × ALCO diesel engines (3 per shaft), 16,000 shp (11,931 kW); GE 800 hp (597 kW) variable pitch bow thruster; 2 hydraulically controlled variable pitch reversible props
- Speed: 20 knots (37 km/h; 23 mph)+; (27 knots (50 km/h) confirmed in 1991)
- Complement: Navy: 12 officers, 211 men; Marines: approximately 400 including officers and enlisted, when embarked
- Armament: 2 × twin 3-inch/50-caliber guns, later replaced by two single 25 mm Mark 38 guns; 1 × 20 mm Phalanx CIWS; 8 × M2 Browning .50 caliber machine guns
- Aviation facilities: Helicopter landing deck aft of stacks

USS Harlan County (LST-1196) was a United States Navy tank landing ship of the Newport class. Entering service in 1972, the ship was active until decommissioned in 1995 and transferred to Spain. Renamed Pizarro, her Spanish service ended in 2012 and in 2013 it was reported that she would be sold to Angola as part of a package with Principe de Asturias. This sale was not completed and, after further attempts to sell the ship were unsuccessful, she was sold for scrap in April, 2016; she was completely dismantled by November, 2016, in El Puerto de Santa Maria, Spain.

== Design and capabilities ==
USS Harlan County, one of the Newport class of LSTs, was designed as a modernized "battle-group" version of the Tank Landing Ships (LSTs) of World War II. The major difference (among many) being these new ships had a v-shaped bow to allow for greater speed (20+ knots), versus the blunt bow LSTs of World War II and later. Harlan County had a displacement of 4,792 long tons (4,868.9 t), but almost doubled in displacement to 8,450 long tons (8,585.6 t) at full load.

The ships of the class had the ability to transport 2,000 short tons (1,814.37 t) of cargo or 500 short tons (453.59 t) for beaching on 1,765 square yards (1,475.8 m^{2}) of deckspace. The ships had the capacity to transport twenty-three AAV-7A1 armored personnel carriers (APCs), or twenty-nine M-48 tanks (used by the Marines), or forty-one 2½ ton cargo trucks (deuce and a halfs) on the tank deck, which had turntables both fore and aft. They could also carry twenty-nine 2½ ton trucks on the upper deck. Harlan County normally carried two LCVPs on the port Welin davit, and another LCVP and an LCPL (Captain's Gig) on the starboard davit.

Harlan County carried 900,000 US gallons (3,400,000 L) of marine diesel, 141,600 US gallons (536,000 L) of vehicle fuel, 20,000 US gallons (76,000 L) of gasoline (mogas), and 10,000 US gallons (38,000 L) of JP-5 aviation fuel. The ship also had below deck berthing in the forward hull for a small battalion of Marine ground forces. A bow thruster and stern anchor was used for ship positioning during bow ramp operations, stern gate launchings, and beaching evolutions. The bow ramp itself was 112 feet (34.14 m) long, and weighs 20 short tons (18.14 t) constructed from aluminum. The ramp was rated at 75 short tons (68.04 t) capacity (an M1A1 Tank weighs 70 short tons (63.50 t)) and when deployed, the aft end fits onto a "king post", upon which it could swivel to a limited degree. The bow ramp (when deployed) is supported by a set of derrick arms, giving the ship its distinctive cross section. Aft of the bow ramp (when extended) is a vehicle ramp (known as the "'tween decks ramp") which allows vehicles to proceed directly from the tank deck to the bow ramp, thence to the deployment site, beach or causeway. When the bow ramp is retracted, the 'tween decks ramp is located directly below and is raised and sealed to ensure water tight integrity between the main deck and the tank deck. A forward turntable facilitates maneuvering of various Marine and Seabee vehicles. At the aft end of the tank deck, another turntable likewise facilitates maneuvering of these vehicles and allows AAV (Marine "LVTs"-Tracked Landing Vehicles) to launch directly into the water via the sterngate, which opens directly to the sea during "launching operations". Four causeway sections could be mounted aft (two on the port side and two on the starboard) of the superstructure directly adjacent the flight deck; these were linked together to form a pontoon bridge which allowed offloading of vehicles when the ship was not to beach herself. These causeway sections were also lashed to the stern gate as needed; "steel beach" was a popular recreational activity for the crew while she was deployed. Causeway sections were married to the stern gate and the crew could enjoy barbecue, beer, and an occasional swim call. For helicopter operations, the ship had a 250 square yards (209.0 m^{2}) landing pad aft of the smoke-stacks and twin 10 short tons (9.07 t) capacity cargo winches. A power-driven cargo hatch leads from the flight deck to the tank deck.

== Service history ==
Harlan County was named after Harlan County, Kentucky as reflected in her unit patch. Her keel was laid on 7 November 1970 at San Diego, California by the National Steel & Shipbuilding Co. She launched on 24 July 1971, sponsored by Mrs. Richard Capen. The ship was commissioned on 8 April 1972. Following commissioning, Harlan County was assigned to the Amphibious Force, Atlantic Fleet, and transited the Panama Canal en route to her home port at Naval Amphibious Base Little Creek.

In September 1979 after fire broke out in the port and starboard engine room of HNLMS Tonijn, Harlan County assisted in towing the submarine to Gibraltar.

The crew of Harlan County affectionately nicknamed her the "Darlin' Harlan", "Supergator", and "the Golden Gator". Over her career, Harlan County routinely deployed to the Mediterranean, Western Africa, and South America, while also conducting amphibious training operations along the east coast of the United States and in the Caribbean. Harlan County served during several notable actions during her career: she was stationed off the coast of Lebanon in 1983 when the Marine barracks in Beirut was bombed; several of her crew volunteered for a "Search and Rescue Detail."

In 1990 Harlan County helped reestablish US Navy cooperation with Argentina; she was the first US Navy ship to make an official port visit to Buenos Aires since the Falklands War. On 11 October 1993, Harlan County was sent to Port-au-Prince, Haiti to land a contingent of UN police trainers and pave the way for an agreed-upon United Nations intervention. However, she was ordered back to sea a day later in the face of protests; a week after the Battle of Mogadishu, fewer than 200 locals reportedly chanted "Somalia, Somalia," leading her captain to leave port without landing the U.S. and Canadian soldiers aboard.

Harlan County was decommissioned on 14 April 1995 and was temporarily leased to Spain, where she was re-christened as Pizarro (L42) in the Spanish Navy. In 1999 the US government finally sold Harlan County to Spain; the ship was decommissioned by the Spanish Navy on 14 December 2012. In December 2013 it was reported that she would be sold to Angola as part of a package with the Spanish aircraft carrier Príncipe de Asturias. The ship failed to sell and was sold for scrap in April, 2016, for approximately $1-million USD. The ship was completely dismantled between May and November, 2016, at El Puerto de Santa Maria, Spain.
