= USS Bristol County =

1971 Newport-class tank landing ship

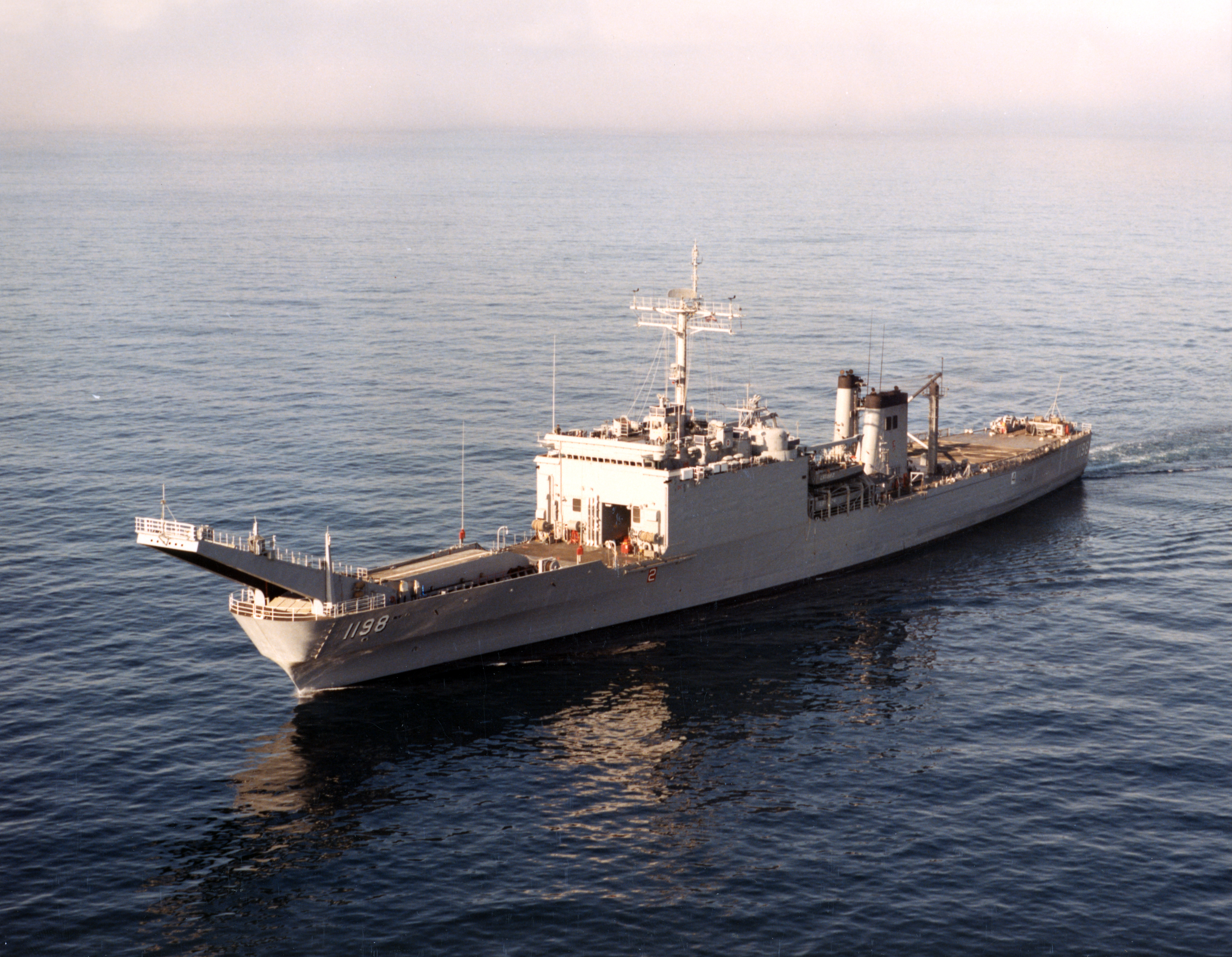
- USS Bristol County

History

United States
- Name: Bristol County
- Ordered: 15 July 1966
- Builder: National Steel and Shipbuilding Company, San Diego, California
- Laid down: 13 February 1971
- Launched: 4 December 1971
- Acquired: 27 July 1972
- Commissioned: 5 August 1972
- Decommissioned: 29 July 1994
- Stricken: 29 July 1994
- Identification: LST-1198
- Fate: Sold to Morocco, 16 August 1994

Morocco
- Name: Sidi Mohammed Ben Abdellah
- Acquired: 16 August 1994
- Decommissioned: 2010
- Identification: 407
- Fate: Sunk as target, May 2013

General characteristics as built
- Class & type: Newport-class tank landing ship
- Displacement: 4,793 long tons (4,870 t) light; 8,342 long tons (8,476 t) full load
- Length: 522 ft 4 in (159.2 m) oa; 562 ft (171.3 m) over derrick arms
- Beam: 69 ft 6 in (21.2 m)
- Draft: 17 ft 6 in (5.3 m) max
- Propulsion: 2 shafts; 6 Alco diesel engines (3 per shaft); 16,500 shp (12,300 kW); Bow thruster
- Speed: 22 knots (41 km/h; 25 mph) max
- Range: 2,500 nmi (4,600 km; 2,900 mi) at 14 knots (26 km/h; 16 mph)
- Troops: 431 max
- Complement: 213
- Sensors & processing systems: 2 × Mk 63 GCFS; SPS-10 radar
- Armament: 2 × twin 3-inch/50-caliber guns
- Aviation facilities: Helicopter deck

USS Bristol County (LST-1198) was the last of the twenty Newport-class tank landing ships of the United States Navy (USN) which replaced the traditional bow door-design tank landing ships (LSTs). The LST was constructed by National Steel and Shipbuilding Company of San Diego, California. Bristol County was launched in 1971 and commissioned into the USN in 1972. Bristol County was assigned to the United States Pacific Fleet and remained in service until 1994 when it was decommissioned. Sold to Morocco that year, the vessel was recommissioned into the Royal Moroccan Navy as Sidi Mohammed Ben Abdellah.

== Design and description ==
Bristol County was a Newport-class tank landing ship which were designed to meet the goal put forward by the United States amphibious forces to have a tank landing ship (LST) capable of over 20 knots (37 km/h; 23 mph). However, the traditional bow door form for LSTs would not be capable. Therefore, the designers of the Newport class came up with a design of a traditional ship hull with a 112-foot (34 m) aluminum ramp slung over the bow supported by two derrick arms. The 34-long-ton (35 t) ramp was capable of sustaining loads up to 75 long tons (76 t). This made the Newport class the first to depart from the standard LST design that had been developed in early World War II.

The LST had a displacement of 4,793 long tons (4,870 t) when light and 8,342 long tons (8,476 t) at full load. Bristol County was 522 feet 4 inches (159.2 m) long overall and 562 ft (171.3 m) over the derrick arms which protruded past the bow. The vessel had a beam of 69 ft 6 in (21.2 m), a draft forward of 11 ft 5 in (3.5 m) and 17 ft 5 in (5.3 m) at the stern at full load.

Bristol County was fitted with six Alco 16-645-ES diesel engines turning two shafts, three to each shaft. The system was rated at 16,500 brake horsepower (12,300 kW) and gave the ship a maximum speed of 22 knots (41 km/h; 25 mph) for short periods and could only sustain 20 knots (37 km/h; 23 mph) for an extended length of time. The LST carried 1,750 long tons (1,780 t) of diesel fuel for a range of 2,500 nautical miles (4,600 km; 2,900 mi) at the cruising speed of 14 knots (26 km/h; 16 mph). The ship was also equipped with a bow thruster to allow for better maneuvering near causeways and to hold position while offshore during the unloading of amphibious vehicles.

The Newport class were larger and faster than previous LSTs and were able to transport tanks, heavy vehicles and engineer groups and supplies that were too large for helicopters or smaller landing craft to carry. The LSTs have a ramp forward of the superstructure that connects the lower tank deck with the main deck and a passage large enough to allow access to the parking area amidships. The vessels are also equipped with a stern gate to allow the unloading of amphibious vehicles directly into the water or to unload onto a utility landing craft (LCU) or pier. At either end of the tank deck there is a 30 ft (9.1 m) turntable that permits vehicles to turn around without having to reverse. The Newport class has the capacity for 500 long tons (510 t) of vehicles, 19,000 ft^{2} (1,800 m^{2}) of cargo area and could carry up to 431 troops. The vessels also have davits for four vehicle and personnel landing craft (LCVPs) and could carry four pontoon causeway sections along the sides of the hull.

Bristol County was initially armed with four Mark 33 3-inch (76 mm)/50 caliber guns in two twin turrets. The vessel was equipped with two Mk 63 gun control fire systems (GCFS) for the 3-inch guns, but these were removed in 1977–1978. The ship also had SPS-10 surface search radar. Atop the stern gate, the vessels mounted a helicopter deck. They had a maximum complement of 213 including 11 officers.

== Construction and career ==
=== United States service ===
The LST was ordered as the final hull of the third group of the Newport class in Fiscal Year 1967 and a contract was awarded on 15 July 1966. The ship was laid down on 13 February 1971 at San Diego, California, by the National Steel and Shipbuilding Company. Bristol County was launched on 4 December 1971 and commissioned on 5 August 1972. Bristol County was assigned to the Amphibious Force, Pacific Fleet, with the home port of Long Beach, California. The tank landing ship alternated between training operations off the west coast of the United States with deployments to the western Pacific, maintaining this cycle into 1980.

Bristol County was decommissioned and struck from the Naval Vessel Register on 29 July 1994.

=== Moroccan service ===
The ship was purchased by the Royal Moroccan Navy on 16 August 1994 through the Security Assistance Program to replace the troop transport Arrafiq. The LST was renamed Sidi Mohammed Ben Abdellah (407). The ship commemorates the 18th century sultan of Morocco Mohammed ben Abdallah. By late 1995, Sidi Mohammed Ben Abdallah was considered non-operational but was later returned to service. The vessel was based at Casablanca, Morocco. This ship served until she was decommissioned in 2010. In May 2013, Sidi Mohammed Ben Abdellah was sunk as a target.
