= Newport-class tank landing ship =

US Navy tank landing ship class in service 1969 to 2002

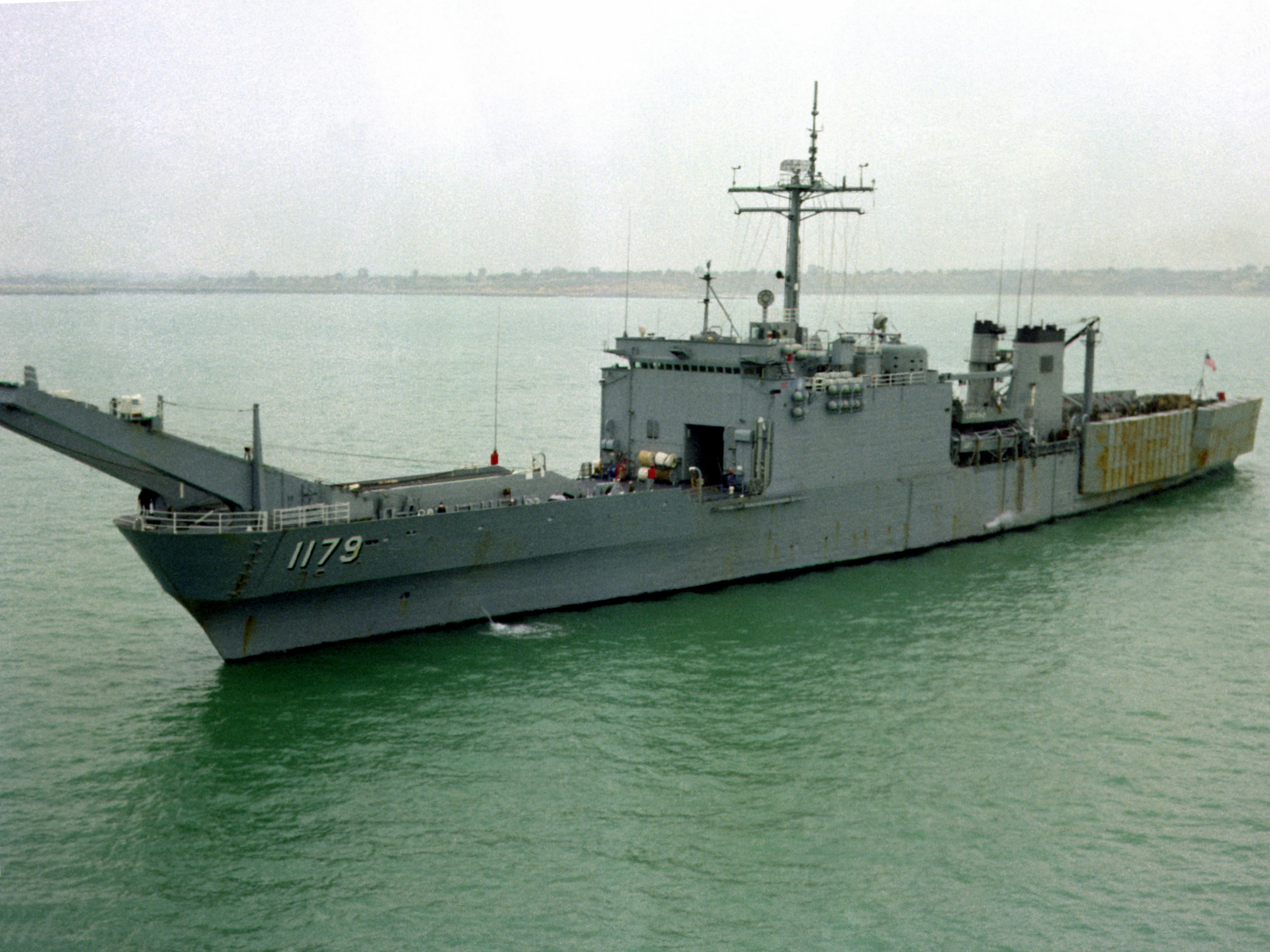
- USS Newport (LST-1179)

Class overview
- Builders: Philadelphia Naval Shipyard; National Steel and Shipbuilding Company
- Operators: Initial; United States Navy; Export; Royal Australian Navy; Brazilian Navy; Chilean Navy; Royal Malaysian Navy; Mexican Navy; Royal Moroccan Navy; Republic of China Navy; Spanish Navy
- Preceded by: De Soto County class
- Succeeded by: Landing Craft Air Cushion
- Built: 1966–1972
- In commission: 1969–present
- Planned: 27
- Completed: 20
- Canceled: 7
- Active: 4
- Lost: 1
- Retired: 16

General characteristics As built
- Type: Tank landing ship
- Displacement: 4,793 long tons (4,870 t) light; 8,342 long tons (8,476 t) full load
- Length: 522 ft 4 in (159.2 m) oa; 562 ft (171.3 m) over derrick arms
- Beam: 69 ft 6 in (21.2 m)
- Draft: 17 ft 6 in (5.3 m) max
- Propulsion: 2 shafts; 6 ALCO or GM diesel engines (3 per shaft); 16,500 shp (12,300 kW); Bow thruster
- Speed: 22 knots (41 km/h; 25 mph) max
- Range: 2,500 nmi (4,600 km; 2,900 mi) at 14 knots (26 km/h; 16 mph)
- Troops: 431 troops or 29 tanks and other vehicles
- Complement: 213
- Sensors & processing systems: 2 × Mk 63 GCFS; SPS-10 radar
- Armament: 2 × twin 3"/50 caliber guns

Newport-class tank landing ships were an improved class of tank landing ship (LST) designed for and employed by the United States Navy from 1969 to 2002. The ships were intended to provide substantial advantages over their World War II-era predecessors. Larger and faster than any previous LST design, they carried a ramp over the bow that allowed them to surpass 20 knots (37 km/h; 23 mph), a goal of the United States amphibious forces. Twenty-seven were planned of which 20 were completed, the high number due to the demands of US force projection estimates. However, the arrival of the air-cushioned landing craft which allowed for over-the-horizon attacks made the class obsolete in the eyes of the United States Navy. Placed in reserve, twelve were eventually sold to foreign navies, while the remaining eight have since been decommissioned.

== Design and description ==
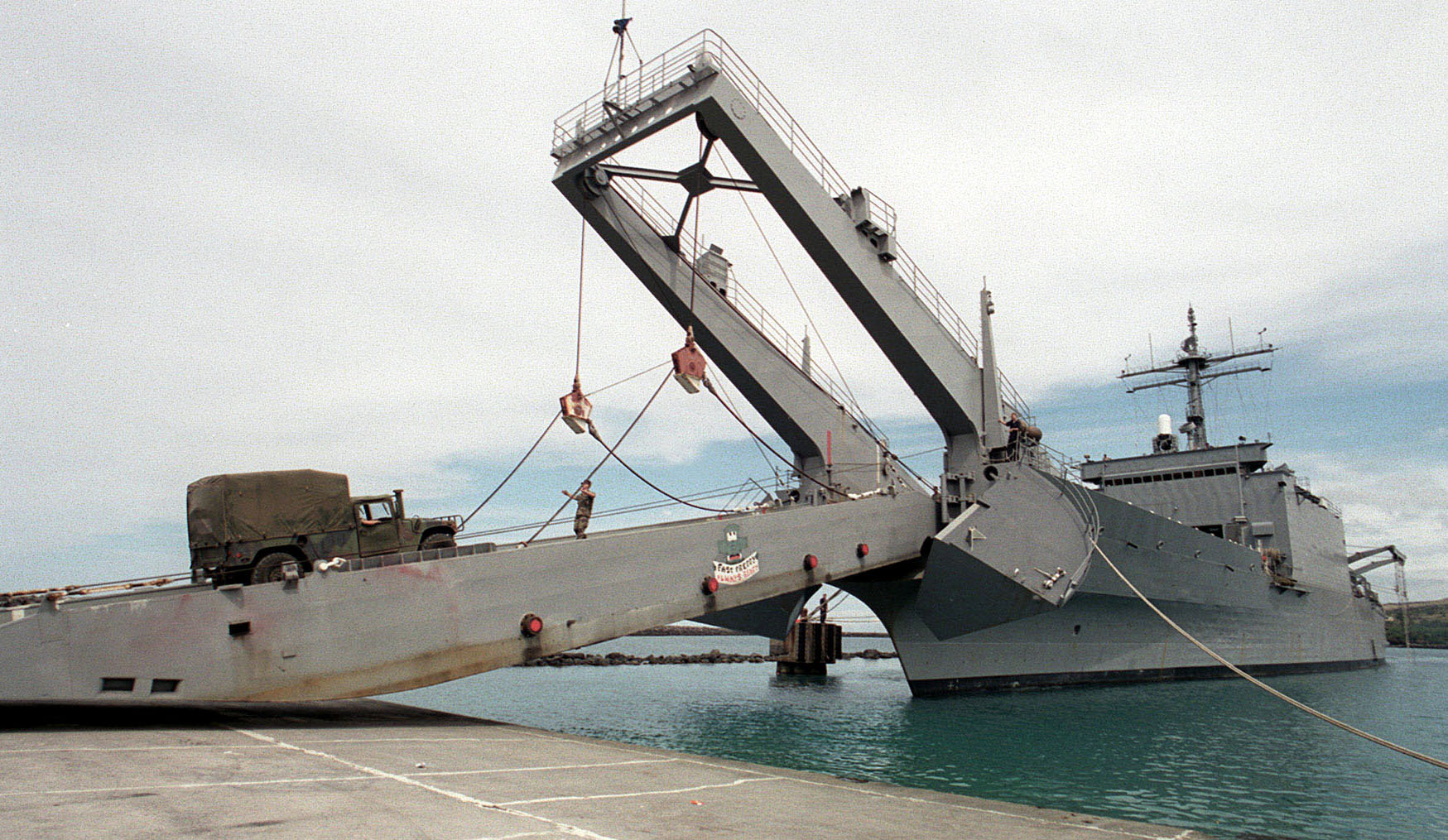
USS Frederick with its bow ramp extended

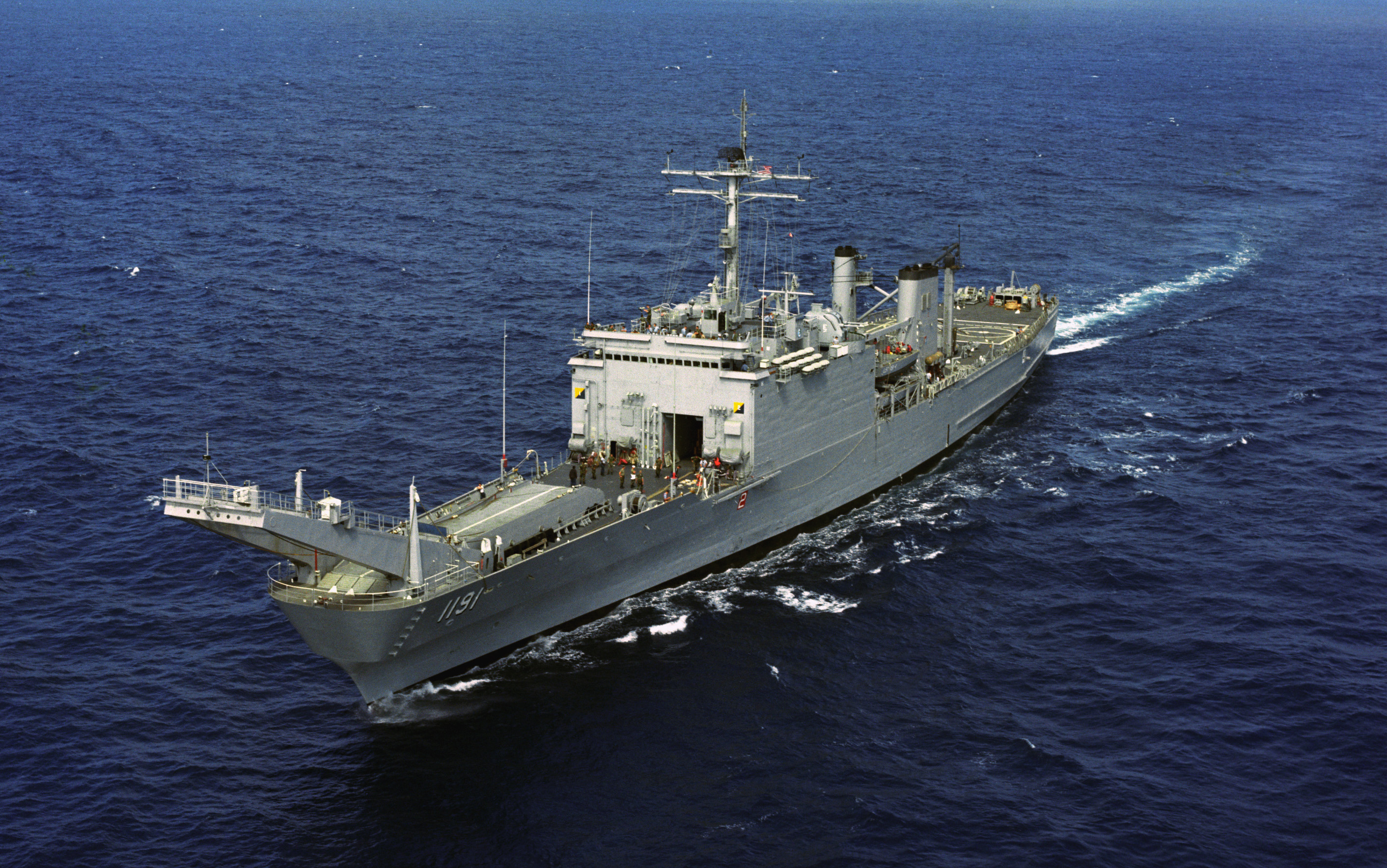
USS Racine bow view with bow ramp sitting on deck

The Newport class were designed under project SCB 247 to meet the goal put forward by the United States amphibious forces to have a tank landing ship (LST) capable of over 20 knots (37 km/h; 23 mph). However, the traditional bow door form for LSTs would not be capable of such speed. Therefore, the designers of the Newport class came up with a design of a traditional ship hull with a 112-foot (34 m) aluminum ramp slung over the bow supported by two derrick arms. The 34-long-ton (35 t) ramp was capable of sustaining loads up to 75 long tons (76 t). This made the Newport class the first to depart from the standard LST design that had been developed in early World War II.

LSTs of the Newport class had a displacement of 4,793 long tons (4,870 t) when light and 8,342 long tons (8,476 t) at full load. They were 522 feet 4 inches (159.2 m) long overall and 562 ft (171.3 m) over the derrick arms which protruded past the bow. They had a beam of 69 ft 6 in (21.2 m), a draft forward of 11 ft 5 in (3.5 m) and 17 ft 5 in (5.3 m) at the stern at full load.

The first three ships of the class were fitted with six General Motors 16-645-ES diesel engines, while the remainder of the class were fitted with six ALCO 16-251 diesel engines turning two shafts, three to each shaft. The system was rated at 16,500 brake horsepower (12,300 kW) and gave the ships a maximum speed of 22 knots (41 km/h; 25 mph) for short periods and could only sustain 20 knots (37 km/h; 23 mph) for an extended length of time. The LSTs carried 1,750 long tons (1,778 t) of diesel fuel for a range of 2,500 nautical miles (4,600 km; 2,900 mi) at the cruising speed of 14 knots (26 km/h; 16 mph). The ships were also equipped with a bow thruster to allow for better maneuvering near causeways and to hold position while offshore during the unloading of amphibious vehicles.

The Newport class were larger and faster than previous LSTs and were able to transport tanks, heavy vehicles and engineer groups and supplies that were too large for helicopters or smaller landing craft to carry. The LSTs have a ramp forward of the superstructure that connects the lower tank deck with the main deck and a passage large enough to allow access to the parking area amidships. The vessels are also equipped with a stern gate to allow the unloading of amphibious vehicles directly into the water or to unload onto a utility landing craft (LCU) or pier. At either end of the tank deck there is a 30 ft (9.1 m) turntable that permits vehicles to turn around without having to reverse. The Newport class has the capacity for 500 long tons (508 t) of vehicles, 19,000 ft^{2} (1,800 m^{2}) of cargo area and could carry up to 431 troops. The vessels also have davits for four vehicle and personnel landing craft (LCVPs) and could carry four pontoon causeway sections along the sides of the hull.

The Newport class were initially armed with four Mark 33 3-inch (76 mm)/50 caliber guns in two twin turrets. They were equipped with two Mk 63 gun control fire systems (GCFS) for the 3-inch guns, but these were removed in 1977–1978. They also had SPS-10 surface search radar. Atop the stern gate, the vessels mounted a helicopter deck. They had a maximum complement of 213 including 11 officers.

== United States service ==
=== Construction and career ===
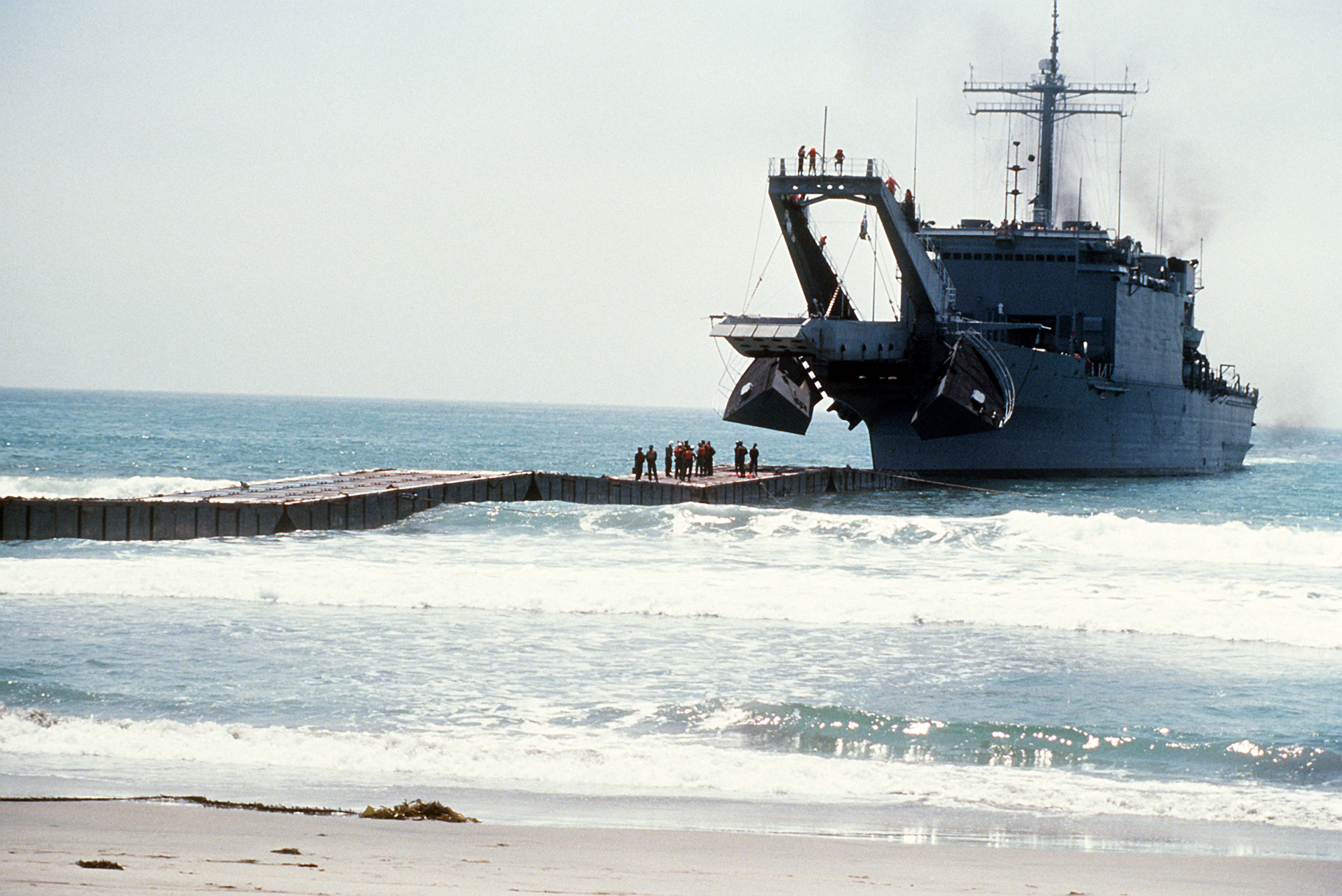
USS San Bernardino during a landing exercise in 1979

The first vessel of the class, Newport was ordered as part of Fiscal Year (FY) 1965. The next eight were authorized in FY 1966, followed by eleven in 1967. The first three LSTs were constructed by Philadelphia Naval Shipyard in Philadelphia, Pennsylvania and the remaining seventeen by National Steel and Shipbuilding of San Diego, California. Seven more were ordered in FY 1971, but these were later deferred, then canceled. Beginning in FY 1981, ships of the class were transferred to the Naval Reserve Force.

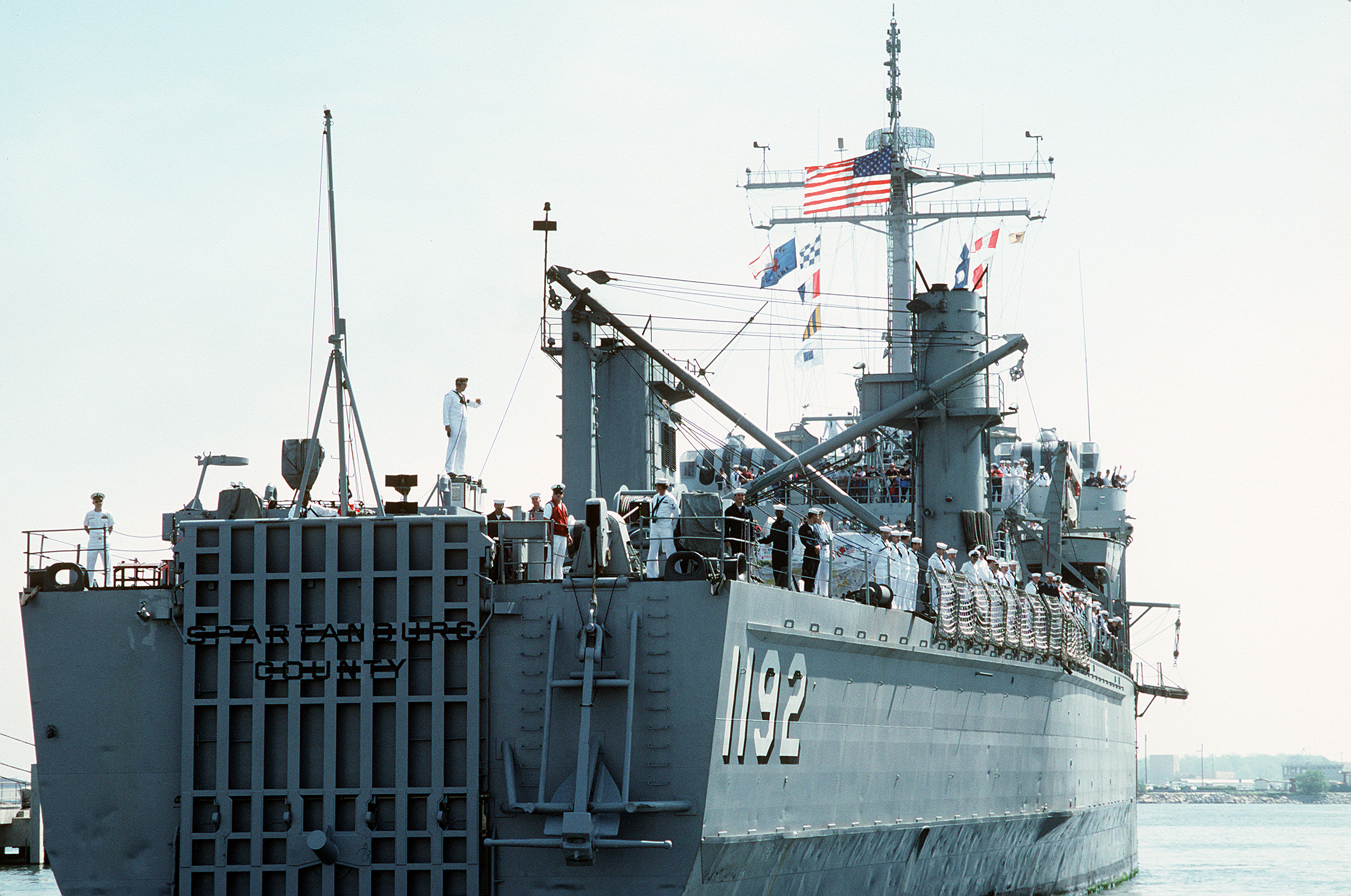
Aft view of Spartanburg County returning from Operation Desert Storm, 1991

By 1994, the 3-inch guns had been removed as a weight saving measure. The 1987 introduction of Landing Craft Air Cushion (LCACs) — which allowed the United States Navy to launch over-the-horizon amphibious landings — made the Newport class obsolete, but they remained with the fleet for another decade because they were the only means by which the hundreds of thousands of gallons of motor vehicle fuel needed by a Marine Expeditionary Force could be landed. Only the development of tankers with the Offshore Petroleum Discharge System (OPDS) and the later development of special fuel bladders which gave the LCACs a tanker capability allowed for their retirement.

=== Ships in class ===
Newport class
Hull No.	Ship name	Builder	Laid down	Launched	Commissioned	Decommissioned	Fate
LST-1179	Newport	Philadelphia Naval Shipyard, Philadelphia, Pennsylvania	1 November 1966	3 February 1968	7 June 1969	1992	Sold to Mexican Navy as ARM Papaloapan
LST-1180	Manitowoc	Philadelphia Naval Shipyard, Philadelphia, Pennsylvania	1 February 1967	4 June 1969	24 January 1970	1993	Sold to Republic of China Navy in Taiwan as Chung Ho
LST-1181	Sumter	Philadelphia Naval Shipyard, Philadelphia, Pennsylvania	14 November 1967	13 December 1969	20 June 1970	1993	Sold to Republic of China Navy in Taiwan as Chung Ping
LST-1182	Fresno	National Steel and Shipbuilding, San Diego, California	16 December 1967	28 September 1968	22 November 1969	1993	Disposed of in support of fleet training exercise, 15 September 2014
LST-1183	Peoria	National Steel and Shipbuilding, San Diego, California	22 February 1968	23 November 1968	21 February 1970	1994	Disposed of in support of fleet training exercise, 7 December 2004
LST-1184	Frederick	National Steel and Shipbuilding, San Diego, California	13 April 1968	8 March 1969	11 April 1970	2002	Sold to Mexican Navy as ARM Usumacinta on 22 November 2002
LST-1185	Schenectady	National Steel and Shipbuilding, San Diego, California	2 August 1968	24 May 1969	13 June 1970	1993	Disposed of in support of fleet training exercise on 13 November 2004
LST-1186	Cayuga	National Steel and Shipbuilding, San Diego, California	28 September 1968	12 July 1969	8 August 1970	1994	Sold to Brazilian Navy as Mattoso Maia, decommissioned in 2023. Sunk as target ship 2025.
LST-1187	Tuscaloosa	National Steel and Shipbuilding, San Diego, California	23 November 1968	6 September 1969	24 October 1970	1993	Sunk as target, July 2014
LST-1188	Saginaw	National Steel and Shipbuilding, San Diego, California	24 May 1969	7 February 1970	23 January 1971	1994	Sold to Royal Australian Navy as HMAS Kanimbla, 1994
LST-1189	San Bernardino	National Steel and Shipbuilding, San Diego, California	12 July 1969	28 March 1970	27 March 1971	1995	Sold to Chilean Navy to as Valdivia
LST-1190	Boulder	National Steel and Shipbuilding, San Diego, California	6 September 1969	22 May 1970	4 June 1971	1994	Towed to Brownsville for scrapping 16 March 2022.
LST-1191	Racine	National Steel and Shipbuilding, San Diego, California	13 December 1969	15 August 1970	9 July 1971	1993	Sunk as a target on 12 July 2018
LST-1192	Spartanburg County	National Steel and Shipbuilding, San Diego, California	7 February 1970	11 November 1970	1 September 1971	1994	Sold to Royal Malaysian Navy as KD Sri Inderapura
LST-1193	Fairfax County	National Steel and Shipbuilding, San Diego, California	28 March 1970	19 December 1970	16 October 1971	1994	Sold to Royal Australian Navy as HMAS Manoora, 1994
LST-1194	La Moure County	National Steel and Shipbuilding, San Diego, California	22 May 1970	13 February 1971	18 December 1971	2000	Disposed of in support of fleet training exercise on 10 July 2001
LST-1195	Barbour County	National Steel and Shipbuilding, San Diego, California	15 August 1970	15 May 1971	12 February 1972	1992	Disposed of in support of fleet training exercise on 6 April 2004
LST-1196	Harlan County	National Steel and Shipbuilding, San Diego, California	7 November 1970	24 July 1971	8 April 1972	1995	Sold to Spanish Navy as Pizarro, decommissioned in 2012
LST-1197	Barnstable County	National Steel and Shipbuilding, San Diego, California	19 December 1970	2 October 1971	27 May 1972	1994	Sold to Spanish Navy as Hernán Cortés, decommissioned in 2009
LST-1198	Bristol County	National Steel and Shipbuilding, San Diego, California	13 February 1971	4 December 1971	5 August 1972	1994	Sold to Royal Moroccan Navy as Sidi Mohammed Ben Abdallah, decommissioned in 2010

== Export service ==
=== Australia ===
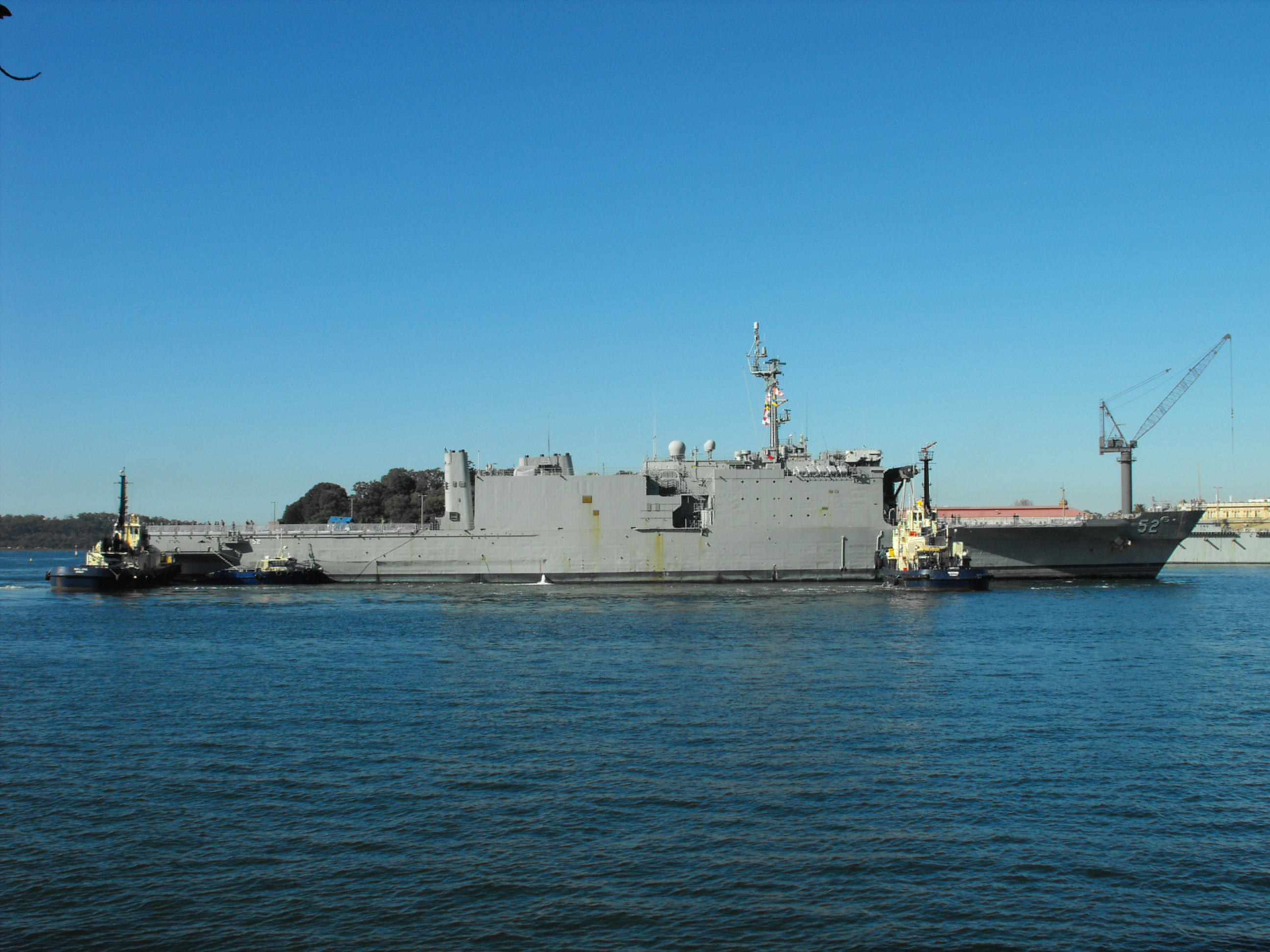
Manoora post conversion

Two LSTs were acquired by the Royal Australian Navy in 1994; Sagainaw on 25 August and Fairfax County on 27 September. Renamed Kanimbla and Manoora, the two vessels underwent conversion in May 1995 at Forgacs Shipbuilding, Newcastle, New South Wales. The LSTs were significantly modified by removing their bow ramps and adding another deck over the bow of the ship, allowing for a third landing spot and increased aviation fuel capacity. Over the new deck two LCM-8 landing craft are carried when the third landing spot is not used, handled by a 70-ton crane. Improved medical facilities were constructed. A hangar was installed aft, allowing for the stowage of four Seahawk helicopters. Both ships were based at Sydney, Australia. The two vessels were taken out of service in 2011 and replaced by HMAS Choules and the Canberra-class landing helicopter docks.

==== Ships in class ====
Kanimbla class
Pennant No.	Ship name	Commissioned	Decommissioned	Fate
L 51	Kanimbla	29 August 1994	25 November 2011	Sold for scrap and broken up at New Orleans, Louisiana in October 2013.
L 52	Manoora	25 November 1994	27 May 2011	Sold for scrap and broken up at New Orleans, Louisiana in October 2013.

=== Brazil ===
The Brazilian Navy leased one Newport-class LST from the United States on 26 August 1994. Cayuga was renamed Mattoso Maia and arrived in October. The vessel was acquired outright on 19 September 2000. Negotiations for a second vessel, Peoria, were unsuccessfully ended in 2001.

==== Ships in class ====
Mattoso Maia
Pennant No.	Ship name	Commissioned	Decommissioned	Fate
G 28	Mattoso Maia	30 August 1994	31 October 2023	Sunk as target ship 15 December 2025.

=== Chile ===
The Chilean Navy leased one vessel of the class from the US. A second was offered, but the ship's poor condition led to it being rejected. San Bernardino was leased on 30 September 1995 and renamed Valdivia. In 1997, the LST ran aground and was damaged. Valdivia was refloated and repaired. Due to the age of the vessel, Valdivia was taken out of service on 14 January 2011.

==== Ships in class ====
Valdivia
Pennant No.	Ship name	Commissioned	Decommissioned	Fate
93	Valdivia	30 September 1995	14 January 2011	Sold for scrap in Sierra Leone.

=== Malaysia ===
The Royal Malaysian Navy acquired one Newport-class LST from the United States on 16 December 1994. A second was to be leased in 1998, but the option was not taken up. Spartanburg County arrived in Malaysia in June 1995 and was renamed KD Sri Inderapura. The vessel was refit between 1995 and 1998 at Johore. On 15 December 2002, the ship was damaged by fire. On 8 October 2009, while berthed at the Lumut Naval Base, Sri Inderapura caught fire and sank. The vessel was later raised. Sri Inderapura was officially decommissioned by the Royal Malaysian Navy on 21 January 2010.

==== Ships in class ====
Sri Inderapura
Pennant No.	Ship name	Commissioned	Decommissioned	Fate
1505	Sri Inderapura	1995	21 January 2010	Caught fire and sank on 8 October 2009.

=== Mexico ===
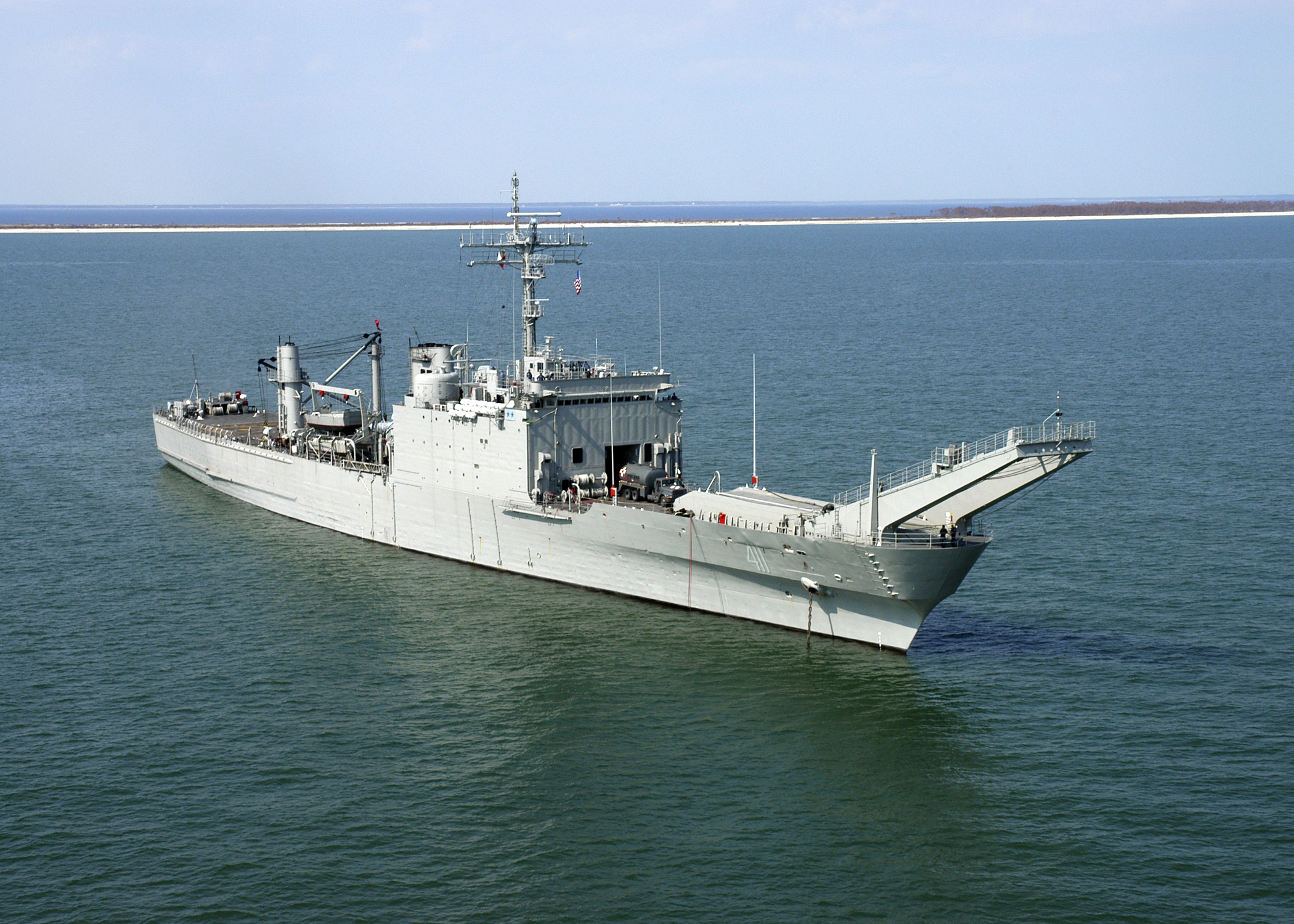
Papaloapan off the coast of Mississippi after Hurricane Katrina.

Mexico acquired two ships from the United States. Newport was purchased on 18 January 2001 and renamed Sonora by the Mexican Navy, before becoming Rio Papaloapan. Frederick was purchased on 9 December 2002 and renamed Usumacinta. Rio Papaloapan is based at Tampico and Usumacinta at Manzanillo.

==== Ships in class ====
Newport class
Hull No.	Ship name	Commissioned	Decommissioned	Fate
A411 (ex-A-04)	Rio Papaloapan (ex-Sonora)	23 May 2001		
A412	Usumacinta	9 December 2002		

=== Morocco ===
The Royal Moroccan Navy acquired one ship from the United States as a grant transfer on 16 August 1994. Bristol County was renamed Sidi Mohammed Ben Abdallah upon entering Moroccan service. The LST was acquired to replace the aging Arrafiq. By late 1995, Sidi Mohammed Ben Abdallah was considered non-operational but was later returned to service.

==== Ships in class ====
Sidi Mohammed Ben Abdallah
Pennant No.	Ship name	Commissioned	Decommissioned	Fate
407	Sidi Mohammed Ben Abdallah	1995	2010	Sunk as a target in May 2013

=== Spain ===
Two ships were leased by the Spanish Navy from the United States. The first, Barnstable County was recommissioned into the Spanish Navy on 26 August 1994 and renamed Hernán Cortés. The second, Harlan County, recommissioned on 14 April 1995 and was renamed Pizarro. Both ships were based at Rota, Spain. Hernán Cortés was initially to be decommissioned in 2006, but continued until 2009, when the vessel was taken out of service. The LST was scrapped at Arinaga, Gran Canaria, Spain in 2014. Pizarro was decommissioned in December 2012 and sold for scrap in February 2016 and was broken up in El Puerto de Santa Maria beginning in March.

==== Ships in class ====
Newport class
Hull No.	Ship name	Commissioned	Decommissioned	Fate
L 41	Hernán Cortés	26 August 1994	2009	Broken up for scrap at Arinaga, Gran Canaria, Spain 2014
L 42	Pizarro	14 April 1995	December 2012	Broken up for scrap in Cádiz, Spain in March 2016

=== Taiwan ===
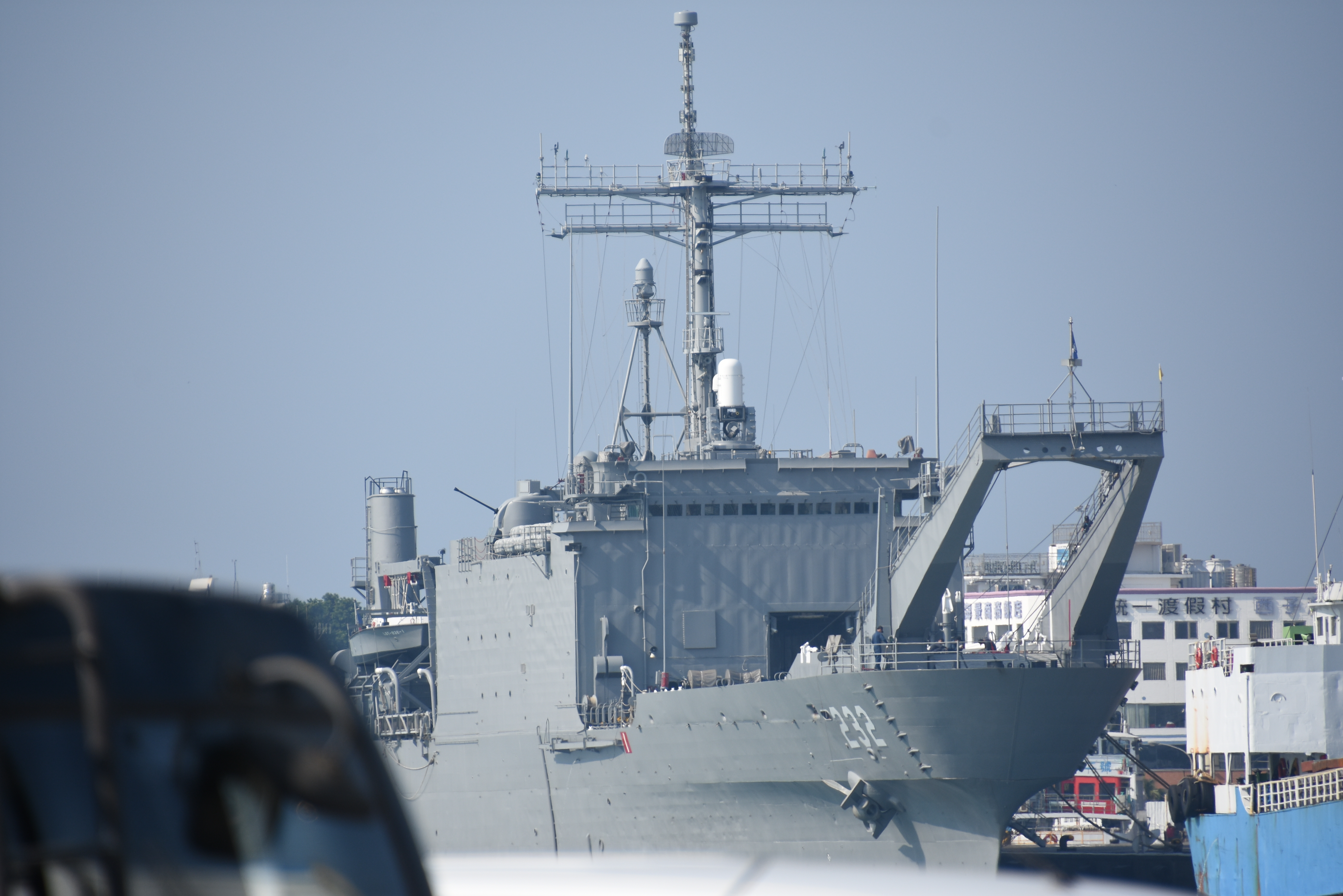
ROCS Chung Ho at the Port of Kaohsiung in 2016

Two ships were leased by the Republic of China Navy (ROCN) from the United States on 1 July 1995. Manitowoc and Sumter were taken to Newport News Shipbuilding and refitted before being recommissioned into the ROCN on 8 May 1997 and renamed Chung Ho and Chung Ping respectively. The two ships were purchased on 29 September 2000.

==== Ships in class ====
Newport class
Hull No.	Ship name	Commissioned	Decommissioned	Fate
232	Chung Ho	8 May 1997		
233	Chung Ping	8 May 1997		

== See also ==
Equivalent landing ships of the same era

- Ropucha class
- Miura class
- Teluk Semangka class
