= USS Manitowoc (LST-1180) =

Newport-class tank landing ship

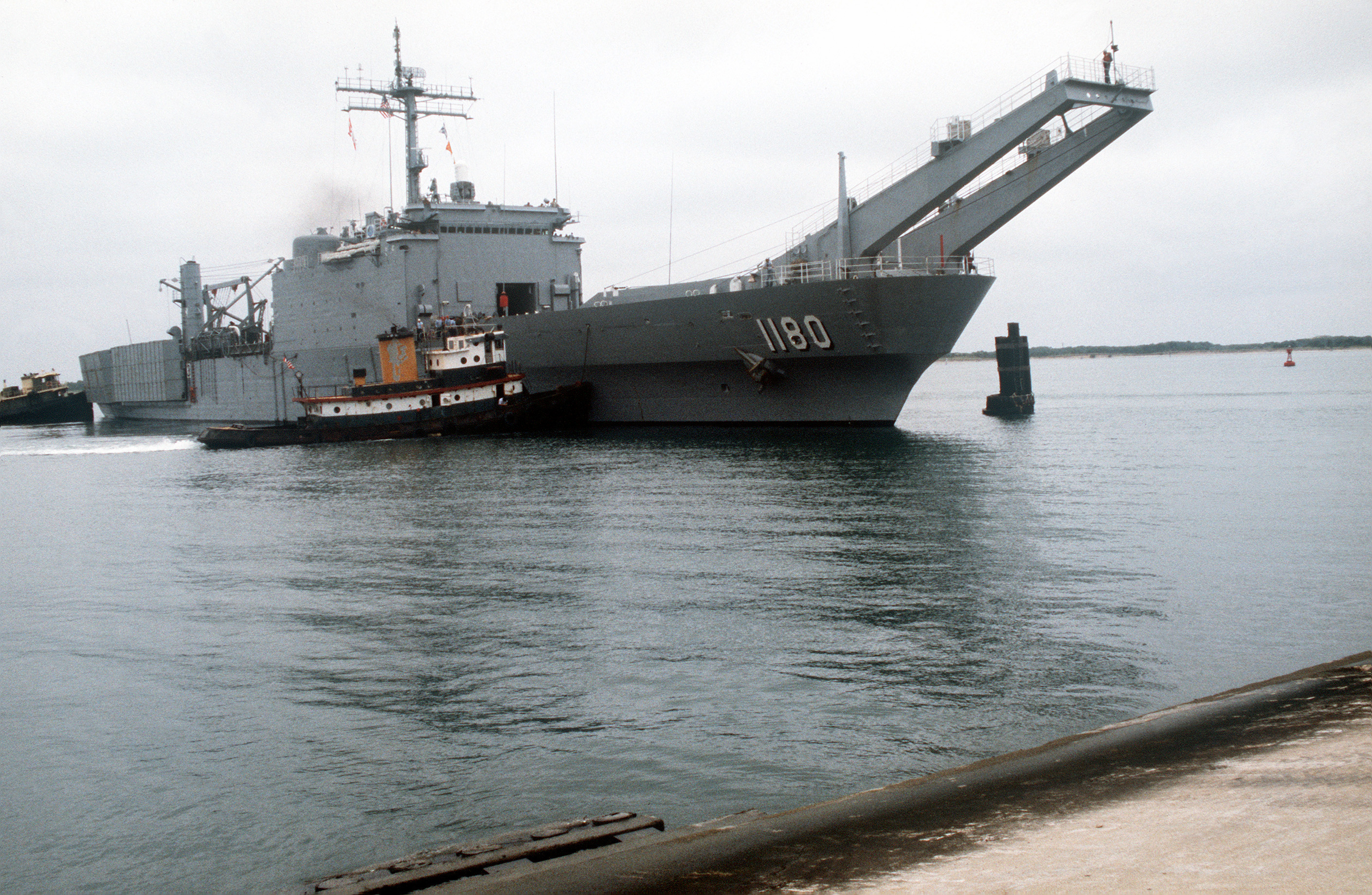
- USS Manitowoc in 1990

History

United States
- Name: USS Manitowoc
- Namesake: Manitowoc, Wisconsin
- Ordered: 29 December 1965
- Builder: Philadelphia Naval Shipyard
- Laid down: 27 February 1967
- Launched: 4 January 1969
- Acquired: 1 April 1970
- Commissioned: 24 January 1970
- Decommissioned: 30 June 1993
- Stricken: 23 July 2002
- Identification: LST-1180
- Fate: Transferred to Taiwan through the Security Assistance Program (SAP), 29 September 2000
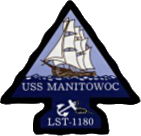
- Badge

Taiwan
- Name: ROCS Chung Ho
- Acquired: 29 September 2000
- Identification: LST-232 In service

General characteristics as built
- Class & type: Newport-class tank landing ship
- Displacement: 4,793 long tons (4,870 t) light; 8,342 long tons (8,476 t) full load
- Length: 522 ft 4 in (159.2 m) oa; 562 ft (171.3 m) over derrick arms
- Beam: 69 ft 6 in (21.2 m)
- Draft: 17 ft 6 in (5.3 m) max
- Propulsion: 2 shafts; 6 GM diesel engines (3 per shaft); 16,500 shp (12,300 kW); Bow thruster
- Speed: 22 knots (41 km/h; 25 mph) max
- Range: 2,500 nmi (4,600 km; 2,900 mi) at 14 knots (26 km/h; 16 mph)
- Troops: 431 max
- Complement: 213
- Sensors & processing systems: 2 × Mk 63 GCFS; SPS-10 radar
- Armament: 2 × twin 3-inch/50-caliber guns
- Aviation facilities: Helicopter deck

USS Manitowoc (LST-1180) was the second ship of the Newport-class tank landing ships which replaced the traditional bow door-design tank landing ships (LSTs) in service with the United States Navy. Manitowoc was constructed by the Philadelphia Naval Shipyard in Philadelphia, Pennsylvania and launched in 1969 and entered service in 1970.

Manitowoc was deployed to Vietnam during the Vietnam War, was part of U.S. peacekeeping efforts in Beirut, Lebanon in 1982–83 and was part of the force sent to invade Grenada during Operation Urgent Fury in 1983. In the early 1990s, the ship took part in operations in the Gulf War before being decommissioned in 1993. The ship was acquired on loan by the Republic of China Navy (ROCN) in 1995 and underwent a refit at Newport News Shipbuilding before being recommissioned into the ROCN in 1997 as ROCS Chung Ho. In 2000, the ROCN acquired the ship outright as part of the Security Assistance Program. The ship remains in service.

== Description ==
Manitowoc was the second of the Newport class which were designed to meet the goal put forward by the United States amphibious forces to have a tank landing ship (LST) capable of over 20 knots (37 km/h; 23 mph). However, the traditional bow door form for LSTs would not be capable. Therefore, the designers of the Newport class came up with a design of a traditional ship hull with a 112-foot (34 m) aluminum ramp slung over the bow supported by two derrick arms. The 34-long-ton (35 t) ramp was capable of sustaining loads up to 75 long tons (76 t). This made the Newport class the first to depart from the standard LST design that had been developed in early World War II.

Manitowoc had a displacement of 4,793 long tons (4,870 t) when light and 8,342 long tons (8,476 t) at full load. The LST was 522 feet 4 inches (159.2 m) long overall and 562 ft (171.3 m) over the derrick arms which protruded past the bow. The vessel had a beam of 69 ft 6 in (21.2 m), a draft forward of 11 ft 5 in (3.5 m) and 17 ft 5 in (5.3 m) at the stern at full load.

Manitowoc was fitted with six General Motors 16-645-ES diesel engines turning two shafts, three to each shaft. The system was rated at 16,500 brake horsepower (12,300 kW) and gave the ship a maximum speed of 22 knots (41 km/h; 25 mph) for short periods and could only sustain 20 knots (37 km/h; 23 mph) for an extended length of time. The LST carried 1,750 long tons (1,780 t) of diesel fuel for a range of 2,500 nautical miles (4,600 km; 2,900 mi) at the cruising speed of 14 knots (26 km/h; 16 mph). The ship was also equipped with a bow thruster to allow for better maneuvering near causeways and to hold position while offshore during the unloading of amphibious vehicles.

The Newport class were larger and faster than previous LSTs and were able to transport tanks, heavy vehicles and engineer groups and supplies that were too large for helicopters or smaller landing craft to carry. The LSTs have a ramp forward of the superstructure that connects the lower tank deck with the main deck and a passage large enough to allow access to the parking area amidships. The vessels are also equipped with a stern gate to allow the unloading of amphibious vehicles directly into the water or to unload onto a utility landing craft (LCU) or pier. At either end of the tank deck there is a 30 ft (9.1 m) turntable that permits vehicles to turn around without having to reverse. The Newport class has the capacity for 500 long tons (510 t) of vehicles, 19,000 ft^{2} (1,800 m^{2}) of cargo area and could carry up to 431 troops. The vessels also have davits for four vehicle and personnel landing craft (LCVPs) and could carry four pontoon causeway sections along the sides of the hull.

Manitowoc was initially armed with four Mark 33 3-inch (76 mm)/50 caliber guns in two twin turrets. The vessel was equipped with two Mk 63 gun control fire systems (GCFS) for the 3-inch guns, but these were removed in 1977–1978. The ship also had SPS-10 surface search radar. Atop the stern gate, the vessels mounted a helicopter deck. They had a maximum complement of 213 including 11 officers.

== Construction and career ==
=== United States Navy service ===
Ordered as part of the second group in Fiscal Year 1966, the LST was laid down at Philadelphia Naval Shipyard in Philadelphia, Pennsylvania on 27 February 1967. The ship was named Manitowoc after the county in Wisconsin on 21 March 1967. The vessel was launched on 4 January 1969 and sponsored by the wife of U.S. Senator Gaylord Nelson of Wisconsin. Manitowoc was commissioned on 24 January 1970.

Manitowoc conducted two deployments off Vietnam in 1971 and 1972 during the Vietnam War. She carried troops to Lebanon in 1982 and 1983 during the U.S. participation in the Beirut Multinational Peacekeeping Force. En route to Lebanon in October 1983 she also participated in Operation Urgent Fury, the invasion of Grenada as part of Amphibious Squadron Four. On 25 October Manitowoc and Fort Snelling, a Thomaston-class dock landing ship, were unexpectedly ordered to transit to the western shore of the island to open a second front on the enemy forces. A beachhead at Grand Mal Bay near the capital city was secured by 13 amphibious landing craft carrying a company of marines which were launched from the LST. Manitowoc participated in the Gulf War before decommissioning on 30 June 1993.

=== Republic of China Navy ===
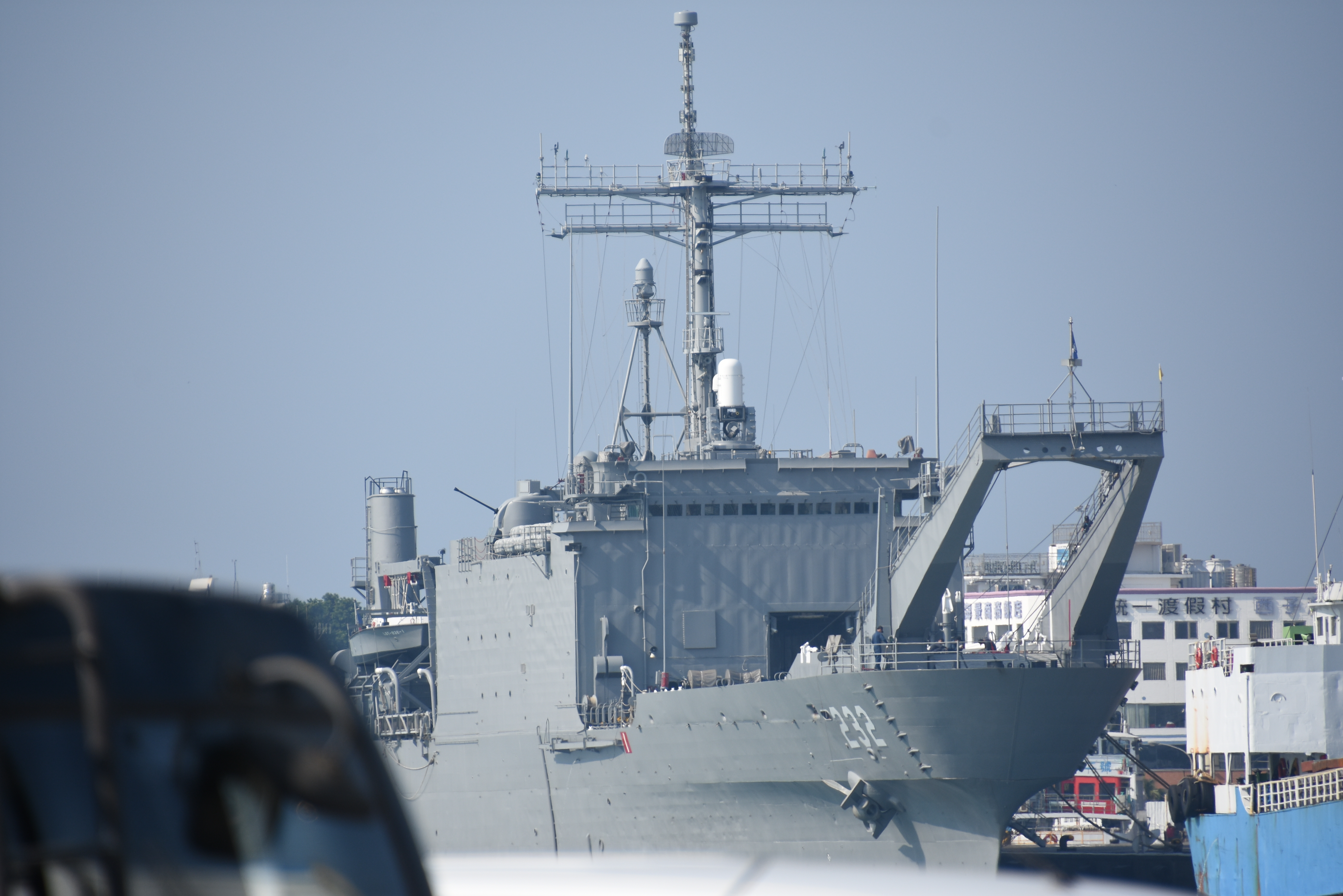
ROCS Chung Ho at the Port of Kaohsiung in 2016

Manitowoc was leased by the Republic of China Navy (ROCN) on 1 July 1995 and sent to Newport News Shipbuilding for a refit. There the vessel's main armament of 3-inch guns were removed and replaced with two twin Bofors 40 mm (1.6 in)/60 gun mounts. Cheng Feng III electronic countermeasures, WD 2A electronic warfare support measures and SPS-67 surface search radar. The LST was renamed Chung Ho and recommissioned into the ROCN on 8 May 1997. The ship was acquired by the Republic of China outright through the Security Assistance Program on 29 September 2000. The vessel was struck from the United States Naval Vessel Register on 23 July 2002.
