= Niterói (disambiguation) =

Niterói is a municipality in the state of Rio de Janeiro, Brazil.

Niterói may also refer to:

- Brazilian frigate Niterói
  - Niterói-class frigate
- Niterói (magazine)
- Niterói Contemporary Art Museum
- Associação Desportiva Niterói, a football team

== See also ==
- Brazilian ship Nictheroy, ships using older spellings for Niterói
