= USS Cayuga (LST-1186) =

Newport-class tank landing ship

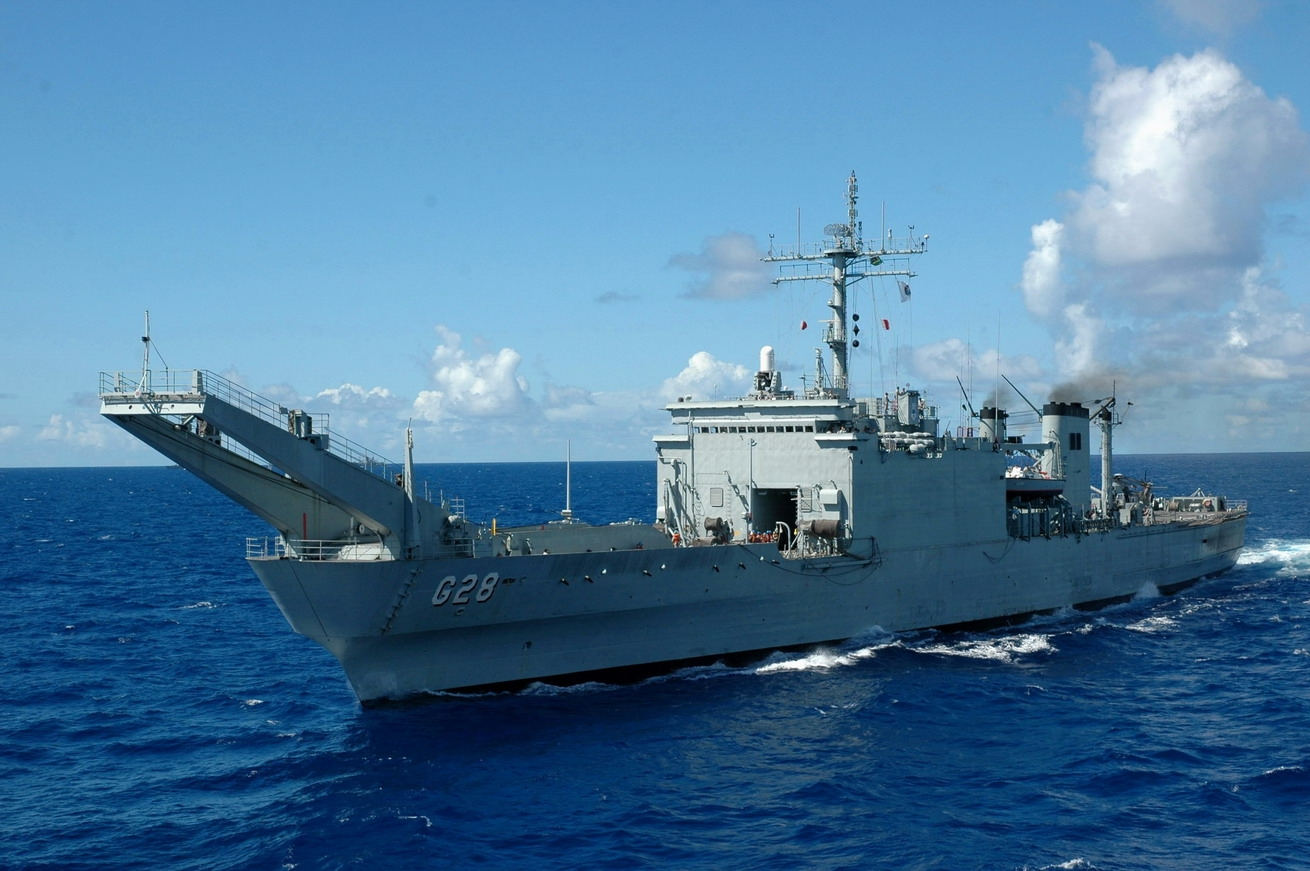
- Mattoso Maia on 7 January 2006

History

United States
- Name: Cayuga
- Namesake: Cayuga
- Ordered: 15 July 1966
- Builder: National Steel & Shipbuilding, San Diego
- Laid down: 28 September 1968
- Launched: 12 July 1969
- Sponsored by: Mrs. Luther C. Heinz
- Commissioned: 8 August 1970
- Decommissioned: 26 August 1994
- Stricken: 23 July 2002
- Honors and awards: 2 x battle star
- Fate: Transferred to Brazil, 24 January 2001

Brazil
- Name: Mattoso Maia
- Namesake: Admiral Jorge do Paço Matoso Maia
- Commissioned: 3 November 1994
- Decommissioned: 31 October 2023
- Identification: Pennant number: G 28; MMSI number: 710410000; Callsign: PWMM
- Nickname(s): O Rhino da Esquadra ("The fleet's Rhino")
- Fate: Sunk as a target on 15 December 2025.

General characteristics as built
- Class & type: Newport-class tank landing ship
- Displacement: 4,793 long tons (4,870 t) light; 8,342 long tons (8,476 t) full load
- Length: 522 ft 4 in (159.2 m) oa; 562 ft (171.3 m) over derrick arms
- Beam: 69 ft 6 in (21.2 m)
- Draft: 17 ft 6 in (5.3 m) max
- Propulsion: 2 shafts; 6 Alco diesel engines (3 per shaft); 16,500 shp (12,300 kW); Bow thruster
- Speed: 22 knots (41 km/h; 25 mph) max
- Range: 2,500 nmi (4,600 km; 2,900 mi) at 14 knots (26 km/h; 16 mph)
- Troops: 431 max
- Complement: 213
- Sensors & processing systems: 2 × Mk 63 GCFS; SPS-10 radar
- Armament: 2 × twin 3"/50 caliber guns
- Aviation facilities: Helicopter deck

USS Cayuga (LST-1186) was a Newport-class tank landing ship of the United States Navy which replaced the traditional bow door-design tank landing ships (LSTs). The vessel was constructed by the National Steel and Shipbuilding Company in San Diego, California and was launched in 1969 and commissioned in 1970. Cayuga took part in the Vietnam War and Gulf War in American service. Decommissioned in 1994, the LST was transferred to the Brazilian Navy the same year on loan and renamed NDCC Mattoso Maia (G 28). The ship was purchased by Brazil outright in 2001. Mattoso Maia took part in MINUSTAH before being taken out of service in 2023. On 15 December 2025, the ship was sunk during a live-fire exercise by the Brazilian Navy near the coast of Rio de Janeiro.

== Design and description ==
Cayuga was a Newport-class tank landing ship which were designed to meet the goal put forward by the United States amphibious forces to have a tank landing ship (LST) capable of over 20 knots (37 km/h; 23 mph). As the traditional flat-fronted bow door form for LSTs would not be capable of such speeds, the Newport class adopted a traditional ship hull pointed bow above which was mounted a 112-foot (34 m) aluminum ramp slung supported by two derrick arms. The 34-long-ton (35 t) ramp was capable of sustaining loads up to 75 long tons (76 t). This made the Newport class the first to depart from the standard LST design that had been developed in early World War II.

The LST had a displacement of 4,793 long tons (4,870 t) when light and 8,342 long tons (8,476 t) at full load. Cayuga was 522 feet 4 inches (159.2 m) long overall and 562 ft (171.3 m) over the derrick arms which protruded past the bow. The vessel had a beam of 69 ft 6 in (21.2 m), a draft forward of 11 ft 5 in (3.5 m) and 17 ft 5 in (5.3 m) at the stern at full load.

Cayuga was fitted with six Alco 16-645-ES diesel engines turning two shafts, three to each shaft. The system was rated at 16,500 brake horsepower (12,300 kW) and gave the ship a maximum speed of 22 knots (41 km/h; 25 mph) for short periods and could only sustain 20 knots (37 km/h; 23 mph) for an extended length of time. The LST carried 1,750 long tons (1,780 t) of diesel fuel for a range of 2,500 nautical miles (4,600 km; 2,900 mi) at the cruising speed of 14 knots (26 km/h; 16 mph). The ship was also equipped with a bow thruster to allow for better maneuvering near causeways and to hold position while offshore during the unloading of amphibious vehicles.

The Newport class were larger and faster than previous LSTs and were able to transport tanks, heavy vehicles and engineer groups and supplies that were too large for helicopters or smaller landing craft to carry. The LSTs have a ramp forward of the superstructure that connects the lower tank deck with the main deck and a passage large enough to allow access to the parking area amidships. The vessels are also equipped with a stern gate to allow the unloading of amphibious vehicles directly into the water or to unload onto a landing craft utility (LCU) or pier. At either end of the tank deck there is a 30 ft (9.1 m) turntable that permits vehicles to turn around without having to reverse. The Newport class has the capacity for 500 long tons (510 t) of vehicles, 19,000 ft^{2} (1,800 m^{2}) of cargo area and could carry up to 431 troops. The vessels also have davits for four vehicle and personnel landing craft (LCVPs) and could carry four pontoon causeway sections along the sides of the hull.

Cayuga was initially armed with four Mark 33 3-inch (76 mm)/50 caliber guns in two twin turrets. The vessel was equipped with two Mk 63 gun control fire systems (GCFS) for the 3-inch guns, but these were removed in 1977–1978. The ship also had SPS-10 surface search radar. Atop the stern gate, the vessels mounted a helicopter deck. They had a maximum complement of 213 including 11 officers.

== Construction and career ==
=== United States Navy service ===
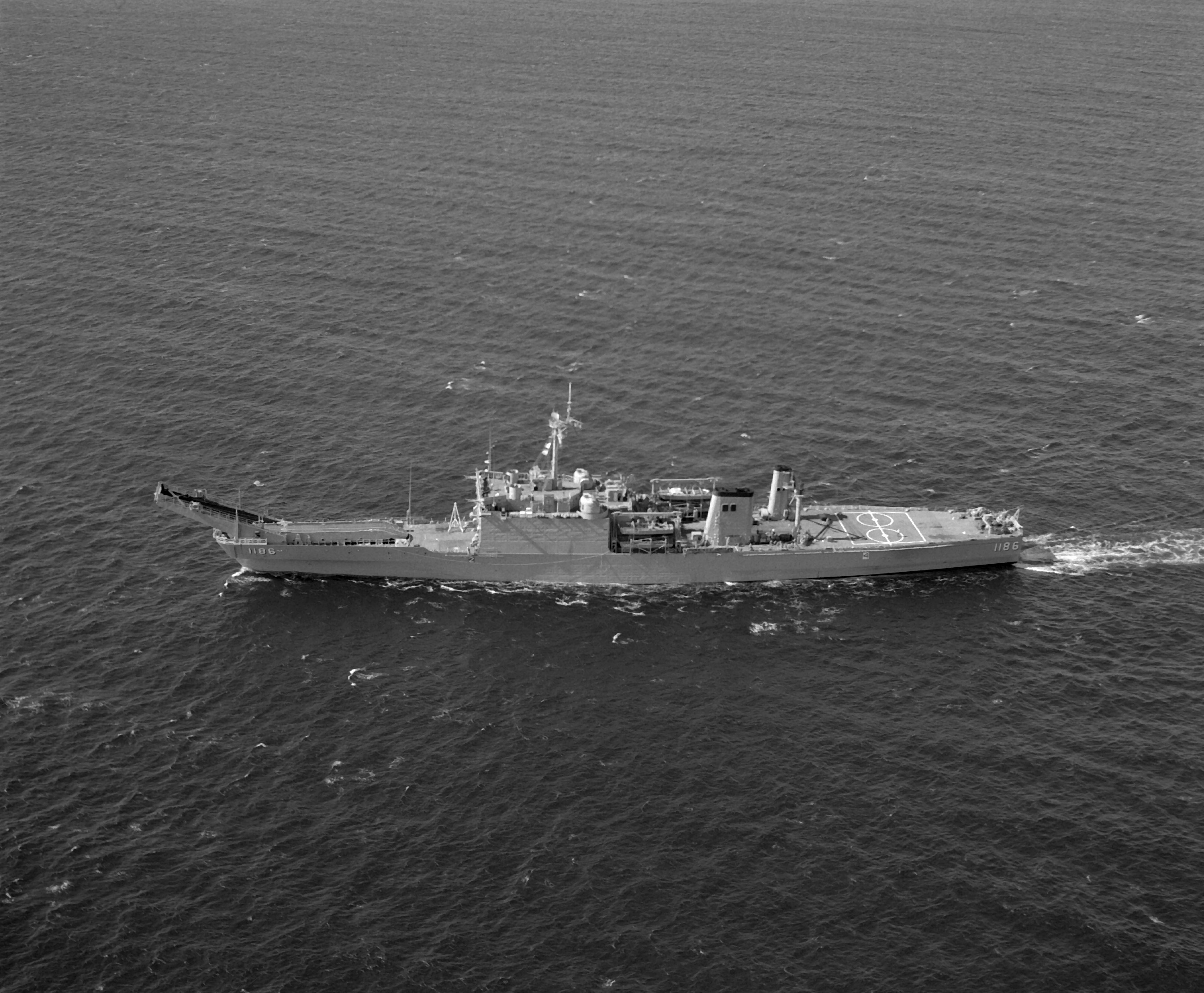
Cayuga in 1979

The ship was ordered as part of the Fiscal Year 1966 group of eight on 15 July 1966. The LST was laid down on 28 September 1968 at San Diego, California, by the National Steel & Shipbuilding Corporation. Named for the county in New York, Cayuga was launched on 12 July 1969, sponsored by the wife of Vice Admiral Luther C. Heinz, Commander of Amphibious Forces, Atlantic. The vessel was commissioned on 8 August 1970. Following commissioning, Cayuga was assigned to the Amphibious Force, Pacific Fleet and home ported at Long Beach, California. The LST alternated amphibious training operations along the west coast of the United States with deployments to the Far East. Cayuga earned two battle stars for Vietnam service.

In May 1972, Cayuga, USS Schenectady, USS Manitowoc, and USS Duluth were part of Operation Song Than 6-72, an amphibious landing of Marines in support of the defense of Huế City in South Vietnam. Cayuga and Duluth were fired on by North Vietnamese Army artillery during the assault on 24 May 1972. The destroyer USS Hanson and other gunfire support ships silenced the opposing guns to cover the retreat of the landing ships.

Cayuga and Amphibious Squadron 5 (PHIBRON 5) participated in Operations Desert Shield and Desert Storm in 1990/1991. PHIBRON 5 joined the rest of the US amphibious forces in the North Arabian Sea after sailing across the Pacific. The unit and returning to its port in Long Beach in April 1991 after an extended deployment. Cayuga carried elements of the 13th Marine Expeditionary Unit's (13th MEU) Battalion Landing Team 1/4. (Note: PHIBRON 5 was composed of Cayuga, USS Durham, USS Fort McHenry, USS Ogden and USS Okinawa.) On 30 October 1990, Cayuga's Marines were detached and sent to train with United Arab Emirates forces. At the end of October, the 13th MEU set out for its return to the United States.

=== Brazilian Navy service ===
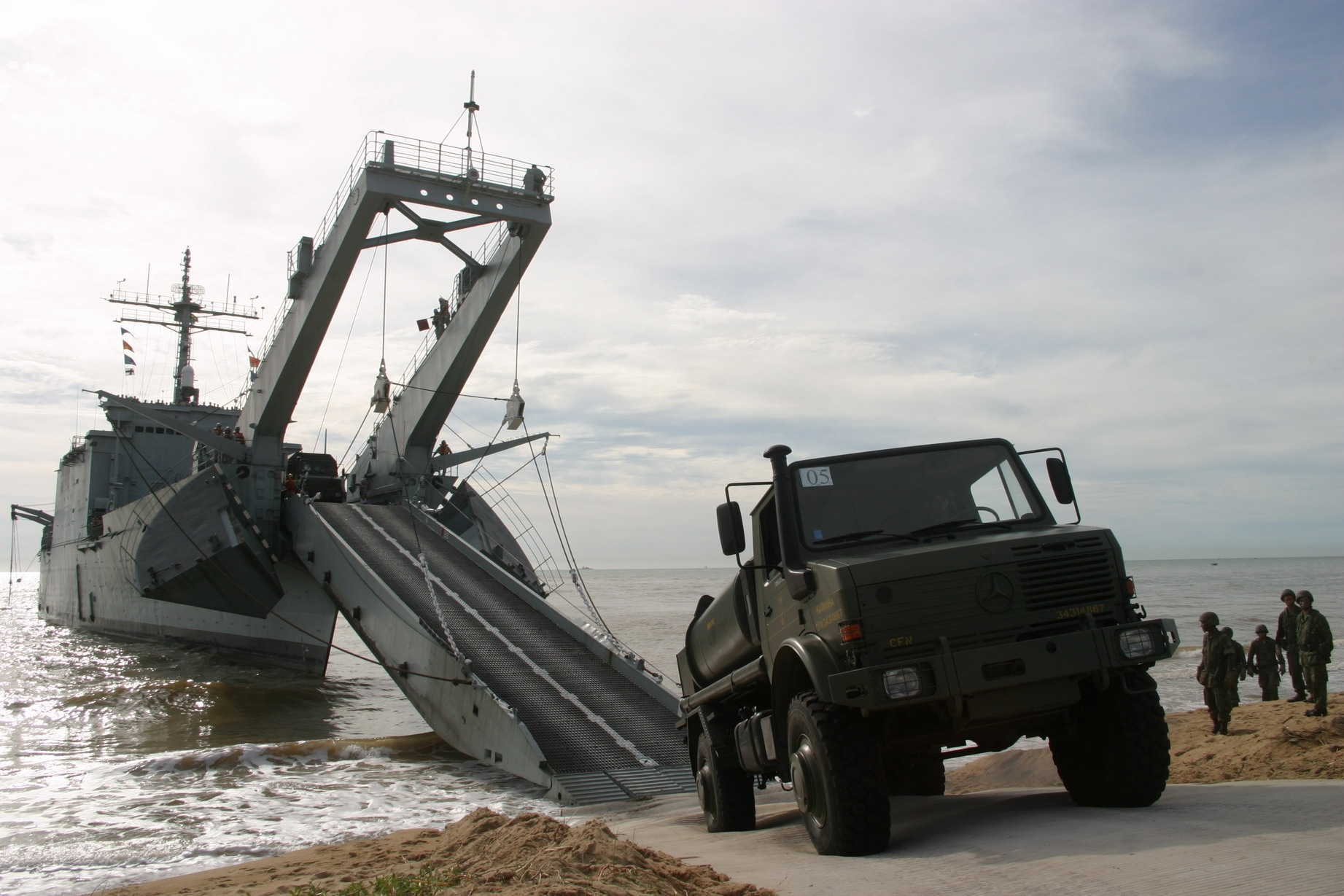
Mattoso Maia lands a truck in a 2005 exercise.

Cayuga was decommissioned 26 August 1994 and leased to the Brazilian Navy. The vessel was recommissioned into the Brazilian Navy on 30 August and renamed NDCC Mattoso Maia (G 28), for Admiral Jorge do Paço Mattoso Maia, Minister of the Navy 1958–1961. (Note: The spelling "Mattoso" was normal at the time though, after spelling reforms, "Matoso" is now more usual for the former minister; the spelling of the ship's name remains unchanged.) On 19 September 2000 the ship was purchased outright by Brazil. On 23 July 2002, Cayuga was struck from the United States Naval Vessel Register.

The vessel took part in several exercises across her Brazilian Navy service, as well as sealift missions in support of the United Nations Stabilisation Mission in Haiti. On 28 May 2004, Mattoso Maia left Rio de Janeiro at noon along with the Grupo-Tarefa (Task Group) 705.2, made up of the dock landing ship Ceará, the frigate Rademaker and the tanker Almirante Gastão Motta heading towards Port-au-Prince in operation HAITI I. Mattoso Maia was loaded with twelve 5-ton Unimog trucks of the Brazilian Marine Corps, including two freezer, two water and two fuel trailers, and a platoon of Marine Corps Police from the Reinforcement Brigade. The Task Group arrived in Haiti on 15 June and left 20 June, but Mattoso Maia remained for 25 more days providing logistical support for the Brazilian MINUSTAH contingent, which included the providing of 350,000 L (77,000 imp gal; 92,000 US gal) of water. During this voyage, the vessel also visited Jamaica for refueling and went through her first replenishment at sea with the Brazilian Navy. The vessel would also take her second voyage to Haiti in 2004, leaving Rio de Janeiro in 18 November with 250 Marines and 160 tons of supplies and arriving in Port-au-Prince in 5 December. She would arrive back at Rio de Janeiro on 3 January bringing home part of the first batch on troops that were deployed in MINUSTAH.

In 2006, after taking part in the exercises ASPIRANTEX-06 and TROPICALEX-I/06, Mattoso Maia was selected on 17 May for operation HAITI III along with Rio de Janeiro, the frigates Niterói and Independência, and the tanker Almirante Gastão Motta. She carried 173 Marines, nine Land Rover and Toyota jeeps, a Land Rover ambulance and two bulldozers, along with an Army Mercedes truck. Almirante Gastão Motta split from the Task Group on 29 May, leaving for Santo Domingo, whilst the frigates left for San Juan on 30 May and Mattoso Maia offloaded at Port-au-Prince on 31 May. The Task Group started their return on 7 June, passing by Curaçao, Belém and Maceió before reaching Rio de Janeiro on 8 July, where Mattoso Maia offloaded 238 Marines as well as 5 EE-11 Urutu armored personnel carriers that were damaged in Haiti. Mattoso Maia would also take voyages to Haiti in July 2007, March and November 2008.

On 23 February 2012 a small-scale fire occurred in the vessel's gym, with the crew bringing the incident under control in around 30 minutes.

The ship was decommissioned on 31 October 2023. On 15 December 2025, the vessel was used as a target ship in a live-fire exercise off the coast of Rio de Janeiro by the Brazilian Navy and sunk.
