= Brazilian ship Nictheroy =

Nictheroy, also spelled Nichteroy, an old spelling of Niterói, is the name of the following ships of the Brazilian Navy:

- Brazilian frigate Nichteroy, a fifth-rate frigate in service 1823–1836 during the Brazilian War of Independence
- Brazilian corvette Nichteroy, an armored corvette launched in 1862 and decommissioned in 1891
- Brazilian cruiser Nictheroy, an auxiliary cruiser in service 1893–1898, sold to the United States and became USS Buffalo
- Brazilian frigate Niterói, lead Niterói-class frigate, in commission 1976–2019

== See also ==
- Niterói (disambiguation)
