= USS Alamo =

U.S. Navy amphibious assault warship

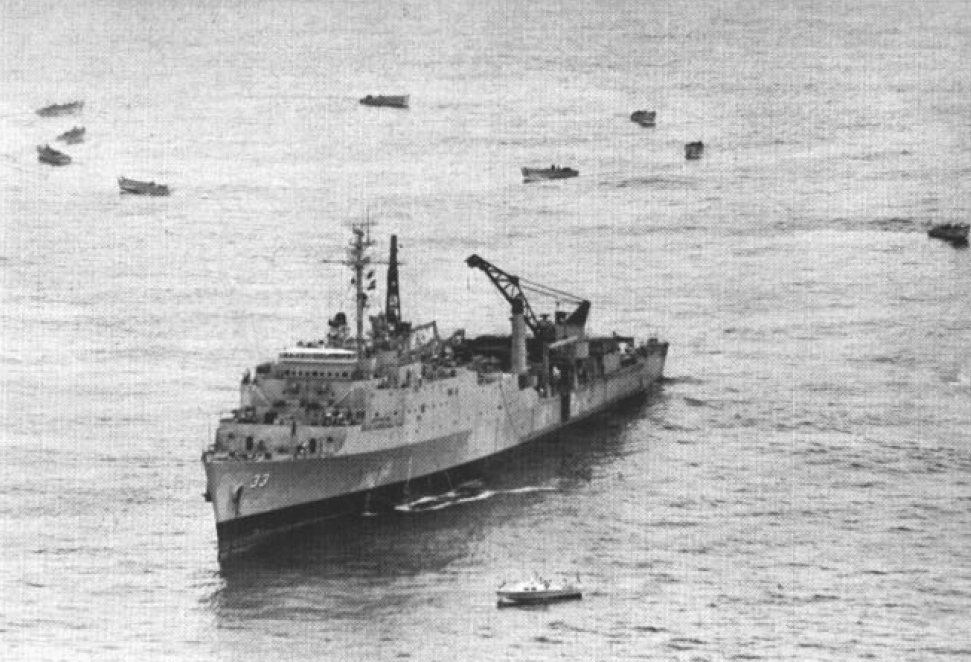
- USS Alamo (LSD-33) off Vietnam in July 1966

History

United States
- Name: USS Alamo
- Namesake: the Alamo
- Awarded: 18 March 1954
- Builder: Ingalls Shipbuilding, Pascagoula, Mississippi
- Laid down: 11 October 1954
- Launched: 20 January 1956
- Commissioned: 24 August 1956
- Decommissioned: 28 September 1990
- Stricken: 24 January 2001
- Fate: Loaned to Brazil, 12 November 1990

Brazil
- Name: Rio de Janeiro (G31)
- Namesake: Rio de Janeiro
- Acquired: 12 November 1990
- Decommissioned: 15 June 2012
- Fate: Scrapped in Alang India 2015

General characteristics
- Class & type: Thomaston-class dock landing ship
- Displacement: 8,899 long tons (9,042 t) light; 11,525 long tons (11,710 t) full load
- Length: 510 ft (160 m)
- Beam: 84 ft (26 m)
- Draft: 19 ft (5.8 m)
- Propulsion: 2 steam turbines, 2 shafts, 23,000 shp (17 MW)
- Speed: 21 knots (39 km/h)
- Boats & landing craft carried: 21 × LCM-6 landing craft in well deck
- Troops: 300
- Complement: 304
- Armament: 4 × twin 3"/50 caliber guns; 6 × twin 20 mm AA guns
- Aircraft carried: 8 helicopters

USS Alamo (LSD-33) was a Thomaston-class dock landing ship of the United States Navy. She was named for the Alamo, site of the 1836 Battle of the Alamo.

Alamo was laid down on 11 October 1954 at Pascagoula, Mississippi, by the Ingalls Shipbuilding Corp.; launched on 20 January 1956; sponsored by Mrs. Daniel V. Gallery, the wife of Rear Admiral Daniel V. Gallery: and commissioned on 24 August 1956.

== 1956–1960 ==
After commissioning, the ship briefly visited Galveston, Tex. then headed for NS Norfolk, Va., to complete her outfitting and initial loading. On 13 October, the dock landing ship sailed for the West Coast. After transiting the Panama Canal, she reached NS San Diego, Calif., her home port, and joined the Amphibious Forces, Pacific Fleet. The ship held amphibious exercises and acceptance trials off San Diego in February 1957. Further training exercises occupied her until 29 May, when she got underway for the Marshall Islands. Alamo paused at Pearl Harbor from 6 to 8 June to load amphibious craft, then continued on to the Marshall Islands. She discharged the craft at Eniwetok on 14 June and for the next 10 days, provided shuttle service between Eniwetok and Bikini Atolls. Alamo put to sea from Bikini on 22 June and steamed by way of Pearl Harbor to San Diego where she loaded landing craft, tugs, and spare parts before sailing for Pearl Harbor on 23 July. There, on 6 August, she embarked Marines and their equipment and put to sea for participation in "Operation Tradewind", conducted in the area of Lahaina Roads, Maui. Alamo returned from this exercise on 15 August; then left Pearl Harbor four days later to return to San Diego.

On 24 September, Alamo began a voyage to the western Pacific (WestPac). She repeated her pattern of loading equipment at Pearl Harbor for transport to Eniwetok. Alamo then shuttled equipment between Eniwetok, Utirik, Kwajalein, and Ujelang Atolls. A voyage to Yokohama, Japan, where she arrived on 17 November, interrupted that duty. Alamo cleared that port on 21 November to resume her shuttling service in the Marshalls before returning to San Diego on 15 December.

The beginning of 1958 brought more training and upkeep. On 8 March, Alamo headed for Pearl Harbor where she joined a fast transport group for a series of amphibious force landing and salvage exercises at Kauai. The ship departed Pearl Harbor on 7 April and reached San Diego on 14 April. Ten days later, she entered the Mare Island Naval Shipyard for an overhaul and returned to her home port on 31 July to begin two and one-half months of refresher training. On 10 October, Alamo sailed for Japan. After loading landing craft at Yokosuka, Alamo headed to Kaohsiung, Taiwan. At that port, the ship conducted amphibious training with units of the Nationalist Chinese Navy until 2 December 1958. She then steamed for independent ship exercises off Okinawa and stopped at Naha to load the men and equipment of Marine Transport Squadron 163 for transportation to Yokosuka. For the next two months, Alamo shuttled various Marine Corps units between Yokosuka and Okinawa, terminating her last voyage of this duty at Naha on 11 February 1959. Three days later she pushed on to Sasebo, Japan, but again got underway for home on 23 February and paid visits to Adak and Kodiak, Alaska, and San Francisco, Calif., before reaching San Diego on 12 March.

Following a round-trip run to Astoria, Oreg., – from 17 to 25 April – to deliver a load of small craft, she took part in exercises with other units of Amphibious Squadron 3 off Coronado, followed by "Operation Twin Peaks", held off the California coast from 18 May to 5 June. Late in September, Alamo sailed for the Far East. The ship visited Kaohsiung, Taiwan; Yokosuka, Iwakuni, Kagoshima, and Shimazu, Japan, Naha, Okinawa, Hong Kong, Subic Bay in the Philippines, and Buckner Bay, Okinawa. After touching at Pearl Harbor, she arrived at San Diego on 3 May 1960. From 25 July to 1 November, the ship was overhauled at the Todd Shipyard, Seattle, Wash.; and, from 14 November to 9 December, she went through refresher training.

== 1961–1964 ==
The ship began 1961 with amphibious refresher training at San Diego and devoted most of the first half of the year to training and gunnery exercises, Naval Reserve training cruises and "Operation Greenlight Phase III". On 17 June, she got underway for another WestPac deployment. Upon her arrival at Subic Bay, Alamo joined the 7th Fleet's Amphibious Ready Group (ARG) and shuttled Marine Corps units to Buckner Bay. She took part in "Operation Warm-Up" off the northwest coast of Okinawa from 13 to 20 October. A visit to Hong Kong followed before the ship returned to Subic Bay and began preparations for her voyage back to the United States. She got underway early in December and arrived at NS San Diego on 16 December.

Alamo remained there until 6 March 1962, when she got underway for San Francisco and the Todd Shipyard for her first interim overhaul. Six weeks later, she returned to San Diego. Local operations occupied her until 16 October when she got underway for the Far East with Amphibious Squadron 3. En route, several ships of the squadron were diverted to the Caribbean in response to the Cuban Missile Crisis, and Alamo was held in Hawaii on a standby basis. On 17 November, she sailed for typhoon-stricken Guam with emergency supplies. After a two-day stop in Guam to unload supplies, the vessel proceeded to Subic Bay. Local operations off San Miguel were held before the ship sailed to Hong Kong for the Christmas holidays.

The ship visited Manila during the New Year's holiday in 1963 then returned to Subic Bay. In January, she took part in Operation Jungle Drum II in Thailand and then spent two days in Bangkok. Her next assignment took her to the flood-stricken island of Mindanao in the Philippines. The month of March was taken up by Operation Silver Blade off Taiwan. After three weeks of restricted availability at Subic Bay, Alamo sailed on 20 April for Yokosuka. The ship finally reached San Diego on 11 May. Following a period of upkeep and training, she got underway for four weeks of operations in the Pacific Northwest with units of Amphibious Squadron 7 and Army Reserve units. Visits to Seattle, Washington, and Portland, Oregon, preceded her return to San Diego on 6 September. In mid-September, the ship entered the Bethlehem Steel Co. shipyard, Long Beach, California, to begin an overhaul which was completed barely in time for her to get back home for the Christmas holidays.

A period of upkeep and refresher training kept the crew busy through March 1964. In April, Alamo proceeded north to assist the earthquake-stricken region around Kodiak, Alaska. She returned to San Diego in May and took part in Operation Pine Tree. Then, after several weeks of preparations, Alamo departed San Diego on 18 June, bound for the Far East. Upon reaching Pearl Harbor, she was involved in Operation Tool Box and had a period of leave and upkeep before sailing for Okinawa on 9 July. Alamo returned to Subic Bay on the last day of July. On 5 August, she sailed with Marine Corps Battalion Landing Team 3/1 (BLT 3/1) embarked for patrol duties off the coast of South Vietnam and, through most of the autumn, alternated periods of leave and upkeep at Hong Kong and Subic Bay with Vietnamese patrol duty through 2 December. The ship arrived back in San Diego on 18 December 1964.

== 1965–1969 ==
Participation in Operation Silver Lance off the coast of southern California lasted from 23 February through 10 March 1965. On 11 March, Alamo was called upon to make an unscheduled run to Yokosuka carrying men and equipment for the American military buildup in the Far East as the United States was beginning direct participation in operations in Vietnam. She returned to San Diego on 12 April. The ship made a second unscheduled deployment to WestPac on 25 May. She sailed to Okinawa, onloaded Marines, then landed them at Qui Nhon and Danang, Vietnam. Alamo touched briefly at Yokosuka, then headed back to San Diego. She took part in Operations Cleansweep and Ragweed during September, devoted most of the autumn to training exercises, and ended the year in port at NS San Diego.

In February 1966, the ship began her seventh major deployment to Westpac. Alamo spent six months operating as a part of an amphibious ready group (ARG) and shuttled troops and equipment from Subic Bay and Okinawa to various points in Vietnam. She returned to the United States in August. In September, her home port was switched to Naval Station Long Beach, California, and she was assigned to the newly formed Amphibious Squadron 7.

In early 1967, she entered drydock at the Todd Shipyard in San Pedro, California, for her third major overhaul which, with the ensuing series of refresher training exercises, accounted for most of the year. In November, the ship sailed for the Far East. There, Alamo was engaged in a series of lifts from Guam and the Philippines to Da Nang. She also again became a member of an ARG and operated along the Vietnamese coast for much of her tour. The ship also participated in four amphibious operations before returning to Long Beach in June 1968.

The ship engaged in local operations along the West Coast for the rest of 1968. On 30 January 1969, she began another WestPac deployment in which she lifted troops and equipment to Da Nang and then proceeded to Subic Bay where she joined ARG "Bravo." The ship also took part in three amphibious operations off the coast of South Vietnam. After eight months away from home Alamo returned to Long Beach on 26 September 1969. The ship then engaged in a series of training exercises and operations for the remainder of the year.

== 1970–1974 ==
Alamo opened 1970 at San Pedro, California, undergoing a restricted availability during which repairs were made to damaged deck plating, cranes, and a boiler. Work was completed on 19 January, and the ship made final preparations for more service in Oriental waters. On 31 January, she sailed with USS Denver to participate in Operation Keystone Bluejay, which involved the withdrawal of American troops from Vietnam. Alamo sailed into Danang harbor on 19 February and began loading Marines and equipment for transportation back to the United States. Alamo debarked the Marines at Camp Pendleton, California, on 14 March and then steamed north to Long Beach. She spent the next four and one-half months in training exercises, refresher training, and availability. On 1 August, Alamo headed out to sea on her 10th WestPac deployment. She stopped at Pearl Harbor and Guam before reaching Subic Bay on 20 August. There, she unloaded her cargo and sailed on 21 August for Danang to bring more Marines back to the United States. Alamo reached Camp Pendleton on 11 September. After 10 days of leave and upkeep she got underway for Danang. Alamo also visited Yokosuka Tokyo, and Subic Bay. She transported landing craft along the Vietnamese coast between such points as Danang, Vung Tau, Song Bo De and An Thoi. In early December, the ship took on board BLT 2/4 for participation in Exercise GRR-1 in Subic Bay. Upon finishing that exercise, she sailed to Hong Kong for Christmas. On 28 December 1970, she returned to the Danang operating area.

The vessel steamed to Mindoro, Philippines, on 5 January 1971 for amphibious operations and moved on to Subic Bay on 10 January to onload equipment to ship to Vietnam. After briefly touching back at Subic Bay, Alamo left Danang to onload Marines and vehicles as part of the general American troop withdrawal. On 1 February, she got underway to return to NS Long Beach and reached home port on 22 February. A leave and upkeep period ensued.

Operations resumed on 5 April as Alamo sailed for southern California waters to hold a midshipman training cruise and amphibious exercises. In early May, Alamo unloaded her ammunition at the Seal Beach Naval Weapons Station in preparation for an overhaul at NS Long Beach. The ship entered drydock on 13 May. Yard work was completed on 15 September, and then began a period of refresher training which lasted through 10 December.

The year 1972 began with the ship in upkeep. Then a series of training exercises in preparation for deployment followed. Prior to her departure, the crew adopted an Irish Setter puppy as the ship's mascot---Lady. In April, Alamo left Long Beach for the Far East. In company with the Amphibious Readiness Group arrived at the beginning of the North Vietnamese Easter Offensive. During her seven and one-half-month WestPac tour, she made numerous troop and equipment lifts to and from Vietnam. During this tour, the ship was attached to Amphibious Squadron 7. Alamo participated in the Second Battle of Quảng Trị, involving the sea and air landing of Republic of Vietnam Marine Corps troops near Quang Tri City in June 1972. She was the Primary Control Ship for an amphibious feint with LVTs and Army of the Republic of Vietnam forces to draw off pressure to the south. Alamo also was a primary control ship for the rescue efforts for flooding victims in Dagupan, Lingyan Gulf, Philippines in July 1972. A Marine CH-53 crashed in the town as it flaired for a landing. The pilot had not accounted for the extra weight of its armor. The assigned ACU-1 LCMS-8s brought out the demolished aircraft. The ship was awarded the Philippine Presidential Unit Citation. Following an offload of Marines in Okinawa she maneuvered south to evade Super Typhoon Rita. In a very unusual and unexpected move, Rita looped around Okinawa and caught her and USS Juneau in high sea and winds. She ballasted down and endured heavy seas with blue water cresting over her bridge. It was also during this deployment that a steering gear failure caused her to collided (port-side to) with an oiler, USS Guadalupe(AO-32), during underway replenishment. Alamo's commanding officer exhibited exemplary seamanship as the ships were entangled in the refueling gear. Following completion of these duties, she got underway and returned to Long Beach on 8 November. Upon arrival the ship's 1MC broadcast the Lone Ranger theme to the delight of the dependents awaiting her return.

The ship remained in upkeep through 27 March 1973. On 28 March, she moved to the Weapons Depot at Seal Beach to unload ammunition. She entered the Bethlehem Shipbuilding Corporation shipyard at San Pedro, California on 5 April for a restricted availability. This period ended on 15 May, when Alamo held sea trials along the California coast. She commenced an availability at San Diego on 28 May to convert the fuel system from Navy standard fuel oil to distillate fuel. This work was completed on 14 September, and the ship sailed to Hunters Point Naval Shipyard on 16 September to begin a week of training. She returned to Long Beach on 24 September. Alamo held amphibious refresher training off Coronado, California, through 12 November, and remained at Long Beach through the end of the year.

The first three weeks of 1974 were spent making final preparations for another WestPac deployment which began on 19 January. Eight days later, Alamo took part in a Marine Corps landing exercise off Kaneohe Bay, Hawaii. She reached Okinawa on Valentine's Day. After refueling and onloading Battalion Landing Team 2/9 (BLT 2/9) she sailed to Numazu, Japan, unloaded the Marines, and pushed on to Yokosuka for a fortnight's restricted availability. Next came port calls at Beppu, Japan, and at Keelung, Taiwan. Alamo's ensuing assignment was an amphibious training exercise off Okinawa which, in turn, was followed by stops at Subic Bay; Chinhae, South Korea; Hong Kong; and Numazu and Yokosuka, Japan. On 30 May, the ship got underway to participate in Exercise Kangaroo I. The assault force gathered in the Coral Sea off the east coast of Australia. On 19 June, she headed for Sydney for a leave period. On 4 July, the ship weighed anchor and sailed home, via Pago Pago, American Samoa, and arrived back at San Diego on 19 July. However her commanding officer was relieved of command in Pearl Harbor following an investigation of unrest exhibited prior to the Australia visit. Local operations, which began for the ship on 23 September, were soon followed by preparations for an overhaul which began at San Diego on 4 December 1974.

== 1975–1979 ==
Alamo got underway for Long Beach on 27 May 1975 and spent the month of June at her home port in restricted availability. On 2 July, Alamo sailed to Seal Beach to take on ammunition and, on 14 July, began amphibious refresher training off San Diego. She sailed on 4 October for another WestPac cruise. Following her arrival at Pearl Harbor, she took part in an amphibious exercise held in Kaneohe Bay from 12 to 14 October. The next day, the ship continued her journey, bound via Kwajalein for Subic Bay. After a brief stop there on 1 November, Alamo sailed to Sasebo for upkeep. She next transported BLT 2/9 from Numazu to Okinawa, then made a trip to Pusan, South Korea. Her other subsequent ports of call included Sasebo and Kagoshima, Japan; Keelung, Taiwan; Buckner Bay, Okinawa, Singapore; Sattahip, Thailand; and Inchon, Korea. On 7 May, Alamo finally set course for the United States. She reached her new home port of NS San Diego on 25 May and, following upkeep, devoted herself to local operations along the California coast for the rest of 1976.

The year 1977 began with three months of refresher training for the ship. On 29 March, she once again set off for the Far East. During this trip, Alamo visited the now-familiar ports of Iwakuni and Numazu, Japan, Subic Bay, Buckner Bay, Inchon and Pusan, Korea, Hong Kong, and Keelung, Taiwan. She also participated in joint exercises with Korean and Thai naval forces and made numerous troop and supply shuttles before getting underway for home on 23 October. On 17 November, Alamo arrived at San Diego and entered a post-deployment standdown period.

On 19 January 1978, Alamo began a fortnight's operations off the southern California coast and then turned to preparations for an overhaul. On 13 March, Alamo entered the Todd Shipyard in San Pedro. She held sea trials in December and was in port at Long Beach for the Christmas holidays.

She returned to San Diego on 11 January 1979. The vessel sailed to Naval Weapons Station Seal Beach on 22 January to load ammunition and then began a series of training exercises. In June, the ship was assigned to resupply duty and provided small boat repair service at the naval outpost on Eniwetok. The group was involved in a cleanup operation to make the island habitable once again. After finishing her work on 28 June, she got underway for Pearl Harbor. At the end of a short stay there, she resumed her voyage and sailed into San Diego harbor on 15 July. She spent the month of August in restricted availability. In September, Alamo took part in a fleet exercise involving over 30 American and Canadian warships that included an amphibious landing on Vancouver Island, just off the Canadian coast. On 9 October, Alamo sailed to Seattle, where she underwent repair work for three weeks. She returned to San Diego on 2 November. The ship spent the remainder of the year preparing for a scheduled WestPac deployment in early 1980.

== 1980–1984 ==
Alamo embarked upon the voyage to the Far East on 4 January 1980. En route, she made stops at Pearl Harbor and Guam before arriving at Subic Bay on 10 February. The dock landing ship stayed in the Philippines through the end of the month, getting underway once between 22 and 26 February to carry out an amphibious landing exercise at Zambales. On 1 March, she departed Subic Bay bound ultimately for duty in the Indian Ocean. Along the way, Alamo stopped at Pattaya, Thailand, and at Singapore. She departed Singapore on 15 March and made her way across the Indian Ocean to the Arabian Sea where she joined the contingency force established in response to the takeover of the American embassy in Tehran, Iran. Alamo operated in that area until the beginning of May. At that time the dock landing ship headed for the Navy facility at Diego Garcia Island. After stopping at Diego Garcia from 5 to 13 May, she returned to sea and shaped a course for Western Australia. Following a five-day visit to Perth, the ship departed Australia on her way back to the Philippines. Alamo paid a five-day visit to Subic Bay as well and then began the voyage back to the United States.

The dock landing ship stopped off at Pearl Harbor between 24 and 26 June to disembark Marines and arrived in San Diego on 3 July. Post-deployment standdown occupied her time from then until 11 August when she began normal operations along the West Coast. She remained so engaged through the end of 1980 and for the bulk of the first six months of 1981. On 24 June Alamo stood out of San Diego for another tour of duty with the 7th Fleet. Once again, however, her western Pacific assignment included an Indian Ocean interlude. After a stop at Pearl Harbor and an exercise out of Buckner Bay, Okinawa, she visited Subic Bay for a fortnight in August. On 21 August, Alamo left the Philippines for the east coast of Africa and arrived in Mombasa, Kenya, on 6 September. There, she participated in a bilateral exercise with Kenyan forces before heading back across the Indian Ocean via Diego Garcia to Australia. After visits to Perth and Sydney and the multilateral exercise Exercise Kangaroo 81, the dock landing ship set course for the Philippines on 1 November. She pulled into Subic Bay on 9 November and remained there for the rest of the month. On 30 November, the ship got underway for the United States.

Alamo reentered San Diego again on 23 December and ended the year with the usual leave and upkeep routine. The relative inactivity following a deployment continued through the end of January 1982. In February, the dock landing ship carried out some operations at sea, but, late in the month, began preparations for regular overhaul. The extended repair period began on 12 April, lasted through the end of 1982, and carried over well into 1983. Overhaul ended on 6 May 1983, and Alamo commenced refresher training in the Southern California Operating Area. Late in June, however, damage to her propulsion plant interrupted her training evolutions and caused her to spend the summer tied up to a pier for repairs. Late in September, Alamo resumed operations at sea.

Service along the West Coast, interrupted sporadically by repair problems, continued through the end of the year and into 1984. In February, she began concentrating her efforts on readiness exercises, trials, and examinations specifically geared to preparing the amphibious warship for her scheduled deployment to the Far East. On 30 May 1984, Alamo embarked upon the voyage to the western Pacific. On the first leg of the crossing she participated in multinational defense exercises with units of the navies of Australia, Canada and New Zealand as well as with elements of the Japan Maritime Self-Defense Force. For the most part, those exercises were conducted in the Hawaiian Islands.

On 3 July, Alamo concluded her visit to Hawaii and resumed the voyage to the Orient. En route, further troubles surfaced in the boilers of her main propulsion plant so that, upon her arrival in Subic Bay on 20 July, she commenced another round of repairs. The dock landing ship carried out post-repair trials during the last week in August and finally departed Subic Bay on 24 August. Alamo reached Buckner Bay, Okinawa, on 27 August and began embarking Marines for transportation to Japan. Between 28 August and 16 September, the amphibious warship made two round-trip voyages between Okinawa and Japan carrying Marines to and from training exercises. On 18 September, she stood out of Buckner Bay on her way to Inchon, South Korea. During the period 18 September to 13 October, she made three round-trip voyages between Okinawa and South Korean ports. Upon her return to Okinawa from the third of those assignments, a problem with her stern gate was due to a maneuver consisting of a 90-degree turn with the rear gate down in the water at 15 knots. The force ripped one of the hinges and a hydraulic rod thrust out the back side end causing her to be tied up with repairs until 2 November. At that time she headed back to Korea to participate in the bilateral exercise "Operation Valiant Blitz 85-1" in cooperation with elements of the South Korean Navy and Marine Corps. Following stops at Buckner Bay and Sasebo, Japan, Alamo began the voyage back to the United States at the end of the third week in November. The dock landing ship made the usual call at Pearl Harbor and then reentered San Diego on 6 December.

== 1985–1990 ==
Post-deployment standdown and holiday routine occupied her time for the rest of 1984 and during the first two weeks of January 1985. Alamo resumed local operations out of her home port late in January. The amphibious warship spent the whole of 1985 conducting exercises, trials, examinations, and inspections either in port in San Diego or in waters adjacent to the west coast. The only break in that schedule came in October when she made a round-trip voyage from the west coast to Hawaii and back for refresher training.

At the beginning of 1986, preparations for her upcoming tour of duty with the 7th Fleet occupied the energies of Alamo's crew. She embarked upon the voyage west on 16 January 1986 and made no stops along the way. The danger of violence during elections in the Philippines even prompted the cancellation of planned exercises at Iwo Jima in order that Alamo and other Navy ships be on station near Manila to render assistance to United States citizens in that eventuality. The threat never really materialized, and she entered Subic Bay on 9 February. Ten days later, the dock landing ship set sail for Hong Kong where she spent the five days from 21 to 26 February. Returning to Subic Bay briefly at the end of the month, Alamo then headed for Okinawa on 2 March. At Okinawa, she embarked troops for a major bilateral amphibious exercise conducted on the South Korean coast. Alamo returned to Okinawa on 1 April but stayed only until 4 April when she got underway for Japan. Following a nine-day call at Sasebo, the dock landing ship returned to Subic Bay on 20 April. From there, she voyaged to Singapore by way of the Indonesian island of Bali. Back in the Philippines by mid-May, Alamo carried out exercises there for the remainder of the month. On 10 June, she headed back to Okinawa. Alamo arrived at her destination on 13 June and spent the next 10 days conducting amphibious exercises at Okinawa.

On 23 June, the dock landing ship put to sea for the passage home. After brief pauses at Iwo Jima and Pearl Harbor, the amphibious warship dropped anchor at Del Mar, California, on 15 July. She moved to San Diego on 16 July and commenced postdeployment standdown. The leave and upkeep period ended during the second week in August, and Alamo started another schedule of amphibious warfare training in waters along the west coast. Those evolutions lasted until 14 October at which time she began a restricted availability at pierside in San Diego. She remained there through the end of 1986.

== Rio de Janeiro (G-31) ==
Alamo was decommissioned 2 November 1990 and loaned the same day to the Brazilian Navy as Rio de Janeiro (G31), being commissioned by the 21st of November. During her tenure with the Brazilian Navy, Rio de Janeiro acted in support of MINUSTAH, transporting Brazilian Army and Marine Corps materiel and personnel between Rio de Janeiro and Port-au-Prince, as well as in several naval exercises.

In 2006, she acted as the flagship to Rear Admiral (Contra-Almirante) Francisco Antônio de Magalhães Laranjeira, commanding officer assigned to the task force responsible for the operation Haiti III leaving Fortaleza towards Haiti. In this maiden voyage to Port-au-Prince, she transported no MINUSTAH materiel, acting solely as a command and control vessel and carrying satellite communications equipment, a group of officers that would be deployed to MINUSTAH, Marine Corps policemen and a detachment of GRUMEC operators responsible for protection of the ships during their stay in port. The task force also involved the landing ship Mattoso Maia, the frigates Niterói and Independência and the tanker Almirante Gastão Motta. The ships left Fortaleza in the 17th of May, arriving at Port-au-Prince in the 30th. The task force left the Caribbean by June 7th, passing by Curaçao, Belém and Maceió on their return trip towards Rio, where they would arrive by the 8th of July.

In her second voyage to Haiti, Rio de Janeiro left her namesake in the 11th of May 2009, during the operation Haiti VII. The materiel she carried included over 70 Army and Marine Corps vehicles such as APCs, backhoes, trucks, jeeps and ambulances, as well as 26 restroom and habitable containers and 5 refrigerated containers, totalling over 700 tons of equipment. The ship would make a stop in Fortaleza by the 17th and 18th of May before arriving in Port-au-Prince in the 29th. During her return trip in early June, she was diverted to the area roughly 600 nautical miles northeast of Natal to participate in the search effort for the wreckage of Air France Flight 447. She would arrive back to Rio de Janeiro in the 2nd of July.

After 22 years of service to the Brazilian Navy, she was decommissioned in the 15th of June 2012, eventually being scrapped in 2014 in Alang.

== Gallery ==
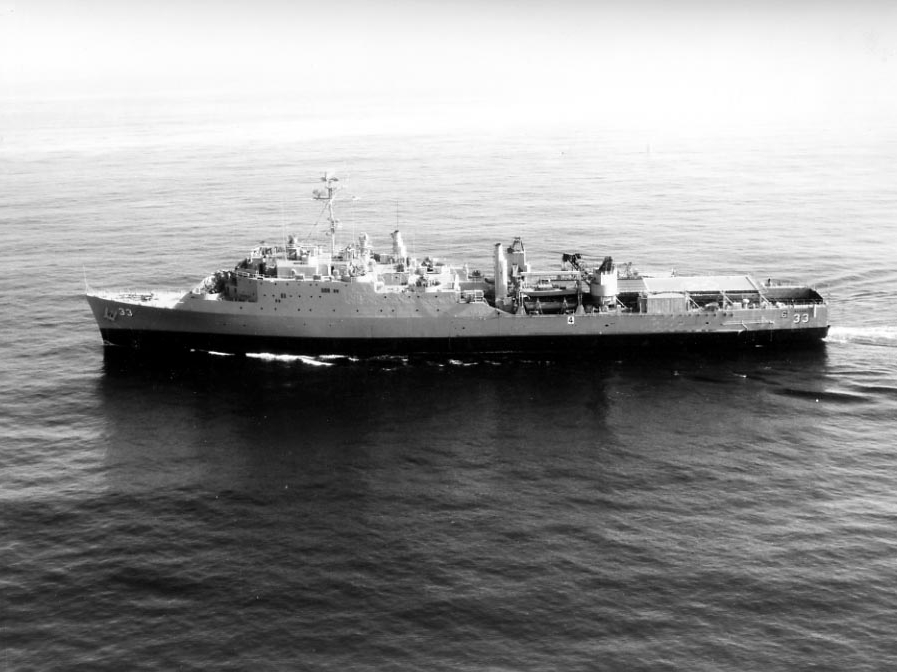
USS Alamo underway off San Diego, 1964.

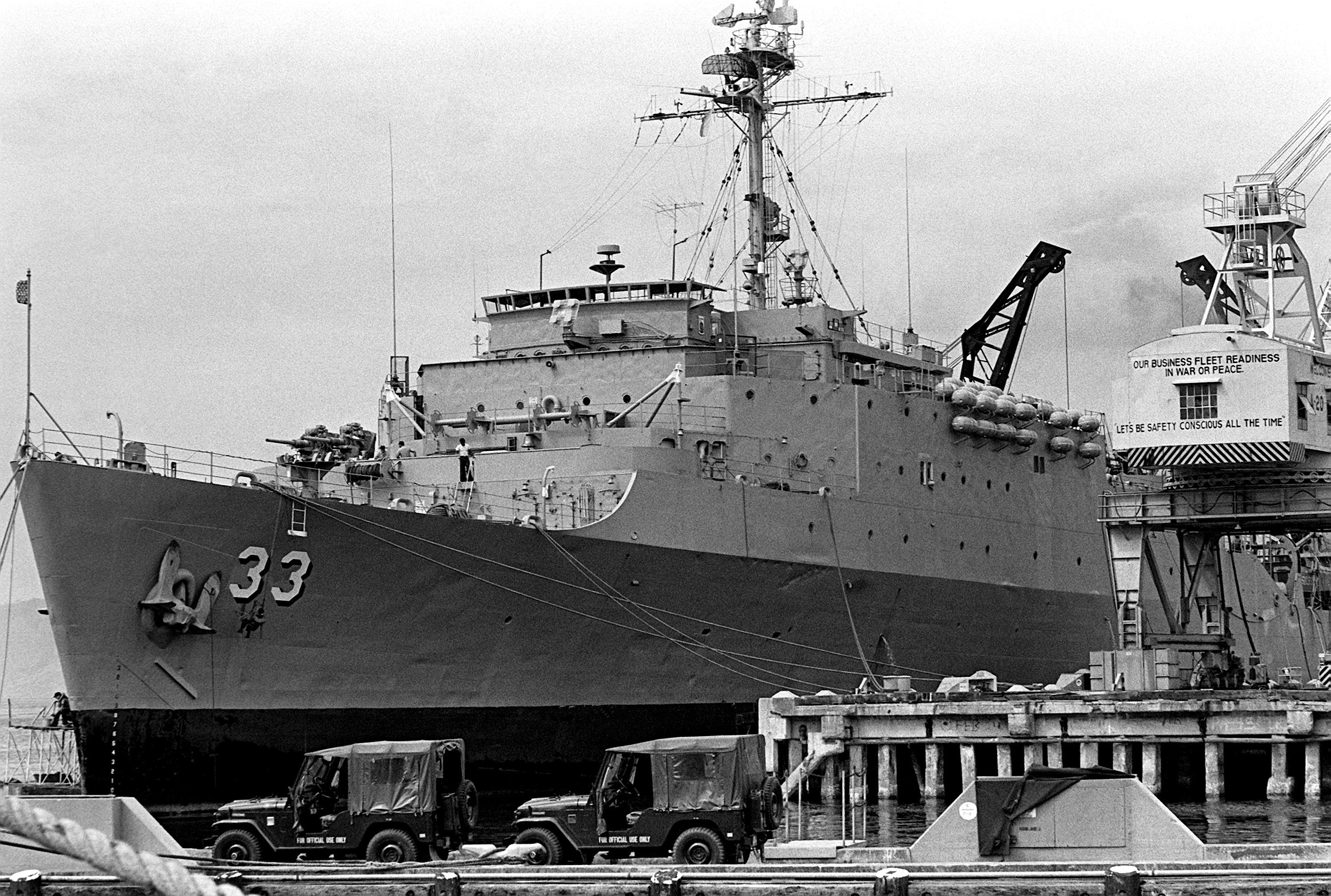
Alamo tied up at Subic Bay, Philippines, 1980.

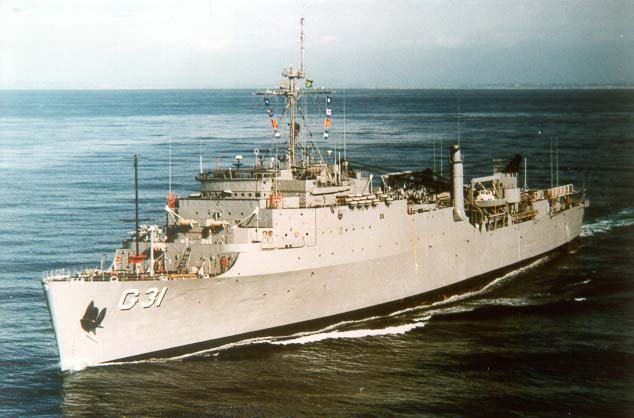
Alamo as Rio de Janeiro (G31) of the Brazilian Navy.

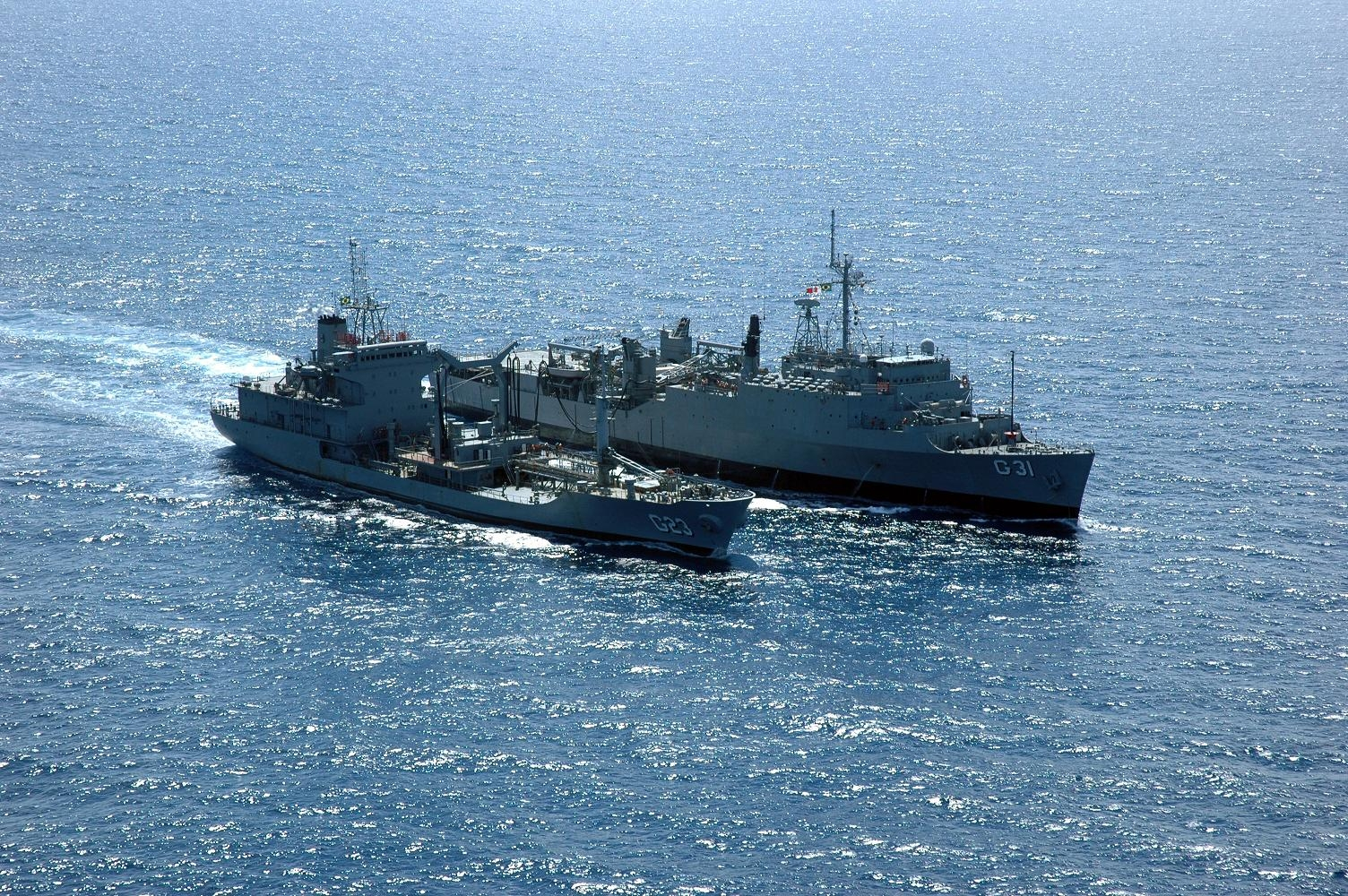
Rio de Janeiro undergoing RAS with Almirante Gastão Motta during her return from Haiti, 2009.
