= G31 =

G31 may refer to:

- BMW 5 Series 5-door estate/wagon (G31)
- Brazilian landing ship Rio de Janeiro (G31)
- Junkers G 31
- Mali G31, a graphics processing unit in the Mali (GPU) series
