= Brazilian training ship Brasil =

Modified training ship Brasil

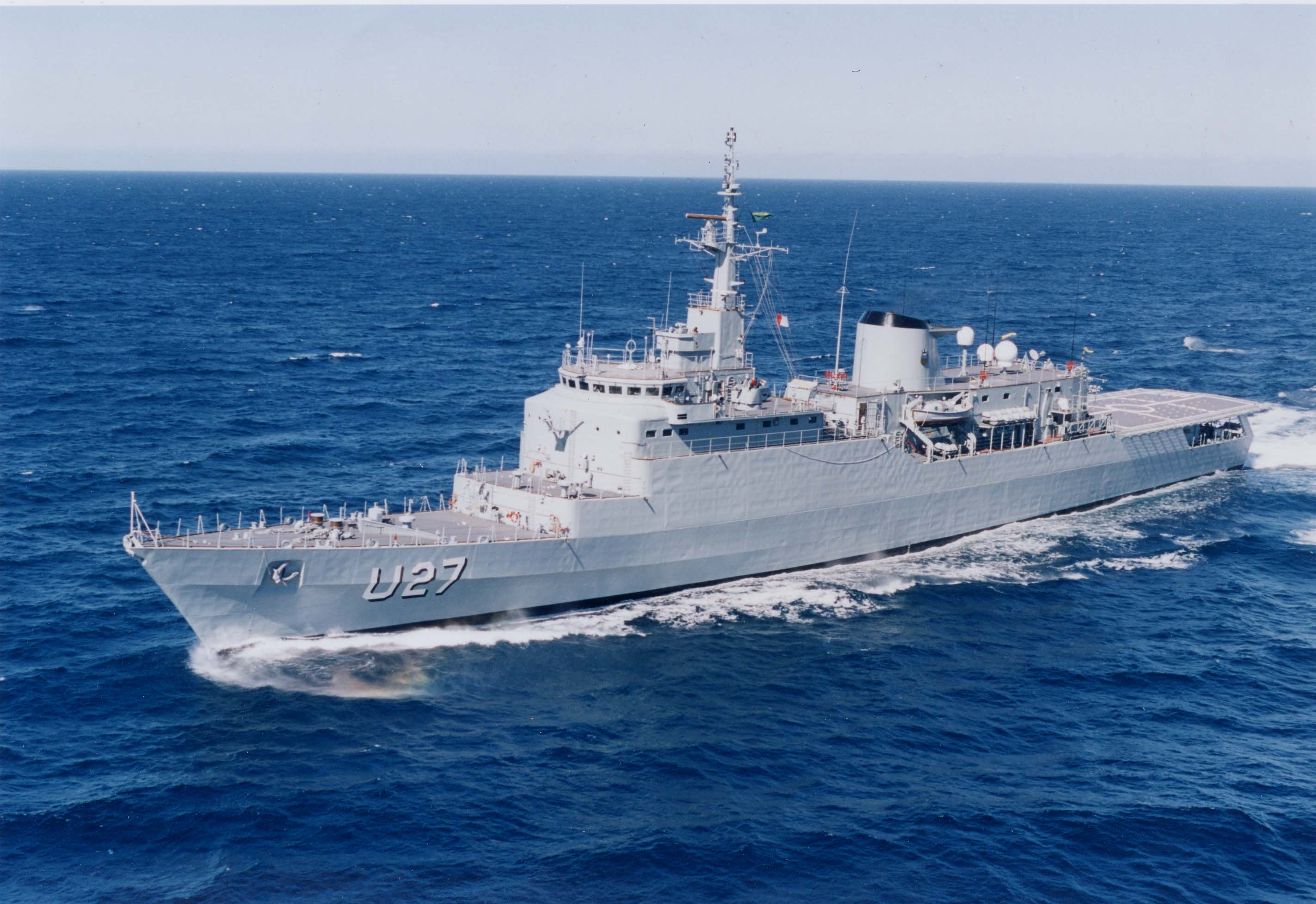
- Brasil

History

Brazil
- Name: Brasil
- Namesake: Brasil
- Ordered: June 1981
- Builder: Arsenal de Marinha do Rio de Janeiro
- Launched: 2 September 1983
- Christened: 18 September 1981
- Commissioned: 21 August 1986
- Home port: Rio de Janeiro
- Identification: MMSI number: 710429000; Callsign: PWBL; Pennant number: U-27
- Status: Active

General characteristics
- Class & type: Niterói-class frigate
- Displacement: 3.355 t (3.302 long tons)
- Length: 129.2 m (423 ft 11 in)
- Beam: 13.5 m (44 ft 3 in)
- Draught: 5.5 m (18 ft 1 in)
- Propulsion: CODOG, two shafts; 2 × Rolls-Royce Olympus TM-3B gas turbines 42,000 kW (56,000 hp) combined; 4 × MTU 16V 956 TB91 diesel engines 13,000 kW (17,000 hp) combined
- Speed: 30 knots (56 km/h; 35 mph) (maximum); 22 knots (41 km/h; 25 mph) (diesels only)
- Range: 5,300 nmi (9,800 km; 6,100 mi)
- Endurance: 45 days
- Complement: 442
- Armament: 2 × single 40 mm Bofors L70 cannons; 2 × MV 508 mm light-emitting rocket launchers, 2 × Schermully 51 mm light-emitting rocket launchers
- Aircraft carried: Westland Super Lynx Mk.21B helicopter
- Aviation facilities: Helipad and hangar

Brasil (U27) is a training ship of the Brazilian Navy ordered in June 1981 at Rio de Janeiro Marine Arsenal Yard, with a budget of US$124.2 million, as a modified version of the Niteroi class of frigates without weapons or sensors. The ship carries 442 midshipmen (officers in training) from the Brazilian Naval and Merchant Marine Academies.

== History ==
The ship was one of the last to be built at the Arsenal docks in Rio de Janeiro with steel plates from Companhia Siderúrgica Nacional, during the last Military Presidency of Brazil under President João Baptista de Oliveira Figueiredo.

Brasil regularly makes a worldwide trip every two years, starting in Rio de Janeiro and visiting ports such as Lisbon, Hamburg and London. At Hamburg it holds the record for the naval ship most often visiting the city, with 28 calls at least. In London, it usually moors alongside HMS Belfast, passing under Tower Bridge. The round trip is during the autumn in Europe, mainly at end of September and middle of October, each time with new students or cadets on board. Formerly the ship was open to local visitors and offered souvenirs such as coins, caps, shirts and catalogues. However, since the Government of President Jair Bolsonaro, the souvenirs were cancelled, and due to the COVID-19 pandemic, the visits were as well.

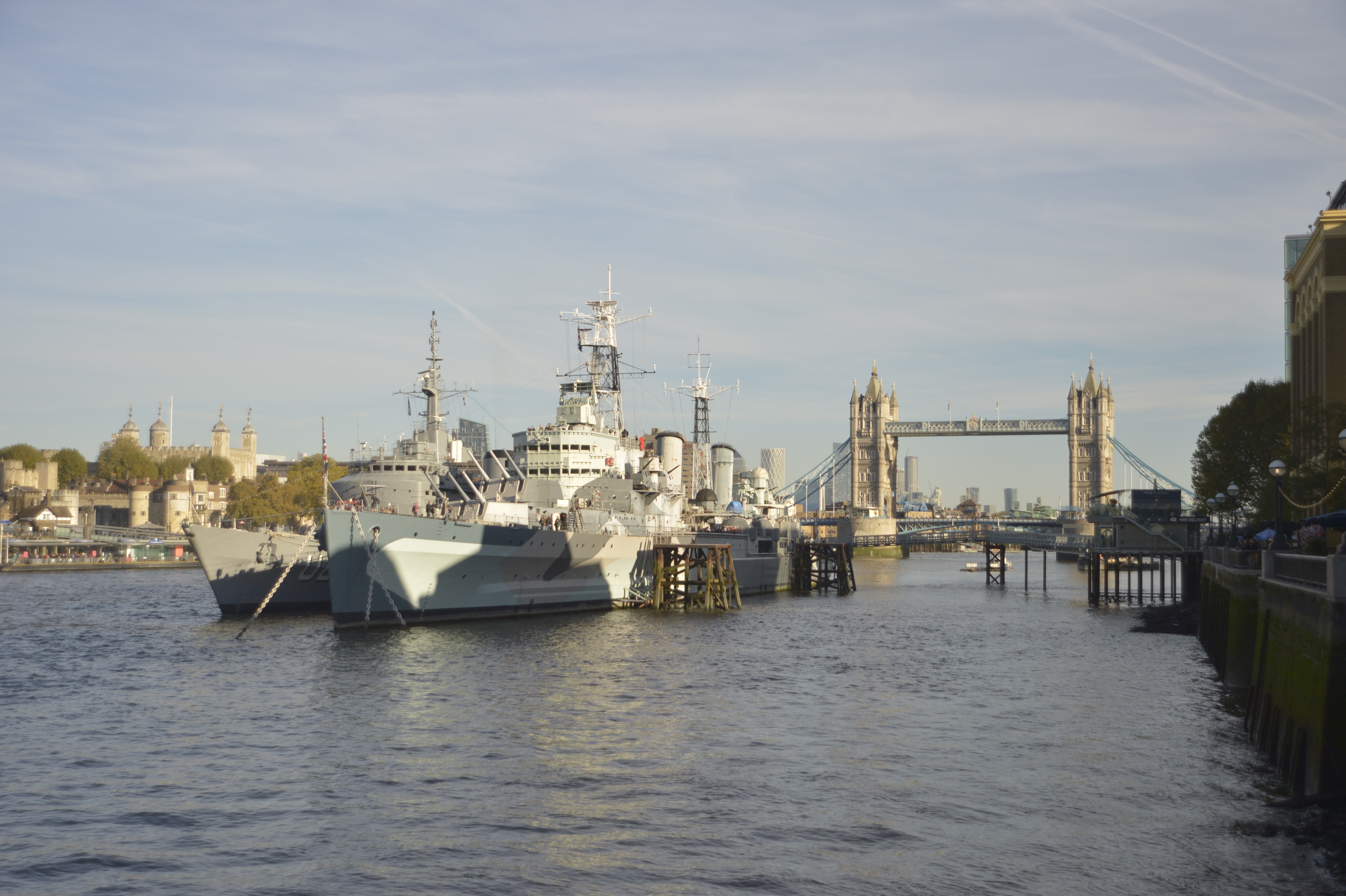
Brazilian Navy U27 training ship (behind) moored alongside HMS Belfast on River Thames.

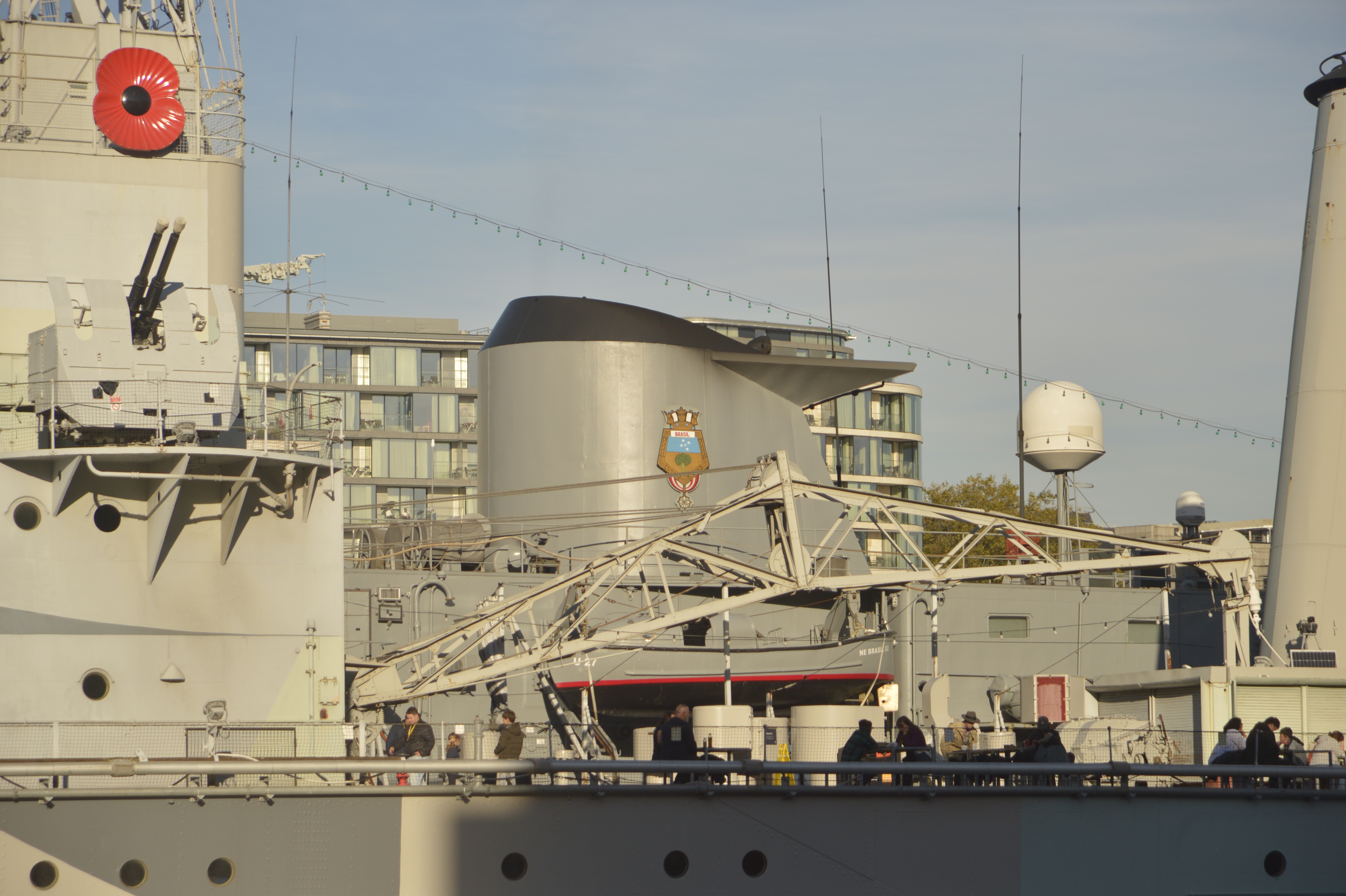
Funnel of Brasil (U27). The ship's badge is visible.
