= Brazilian frigate Defensora =

Niterói-class Frigates

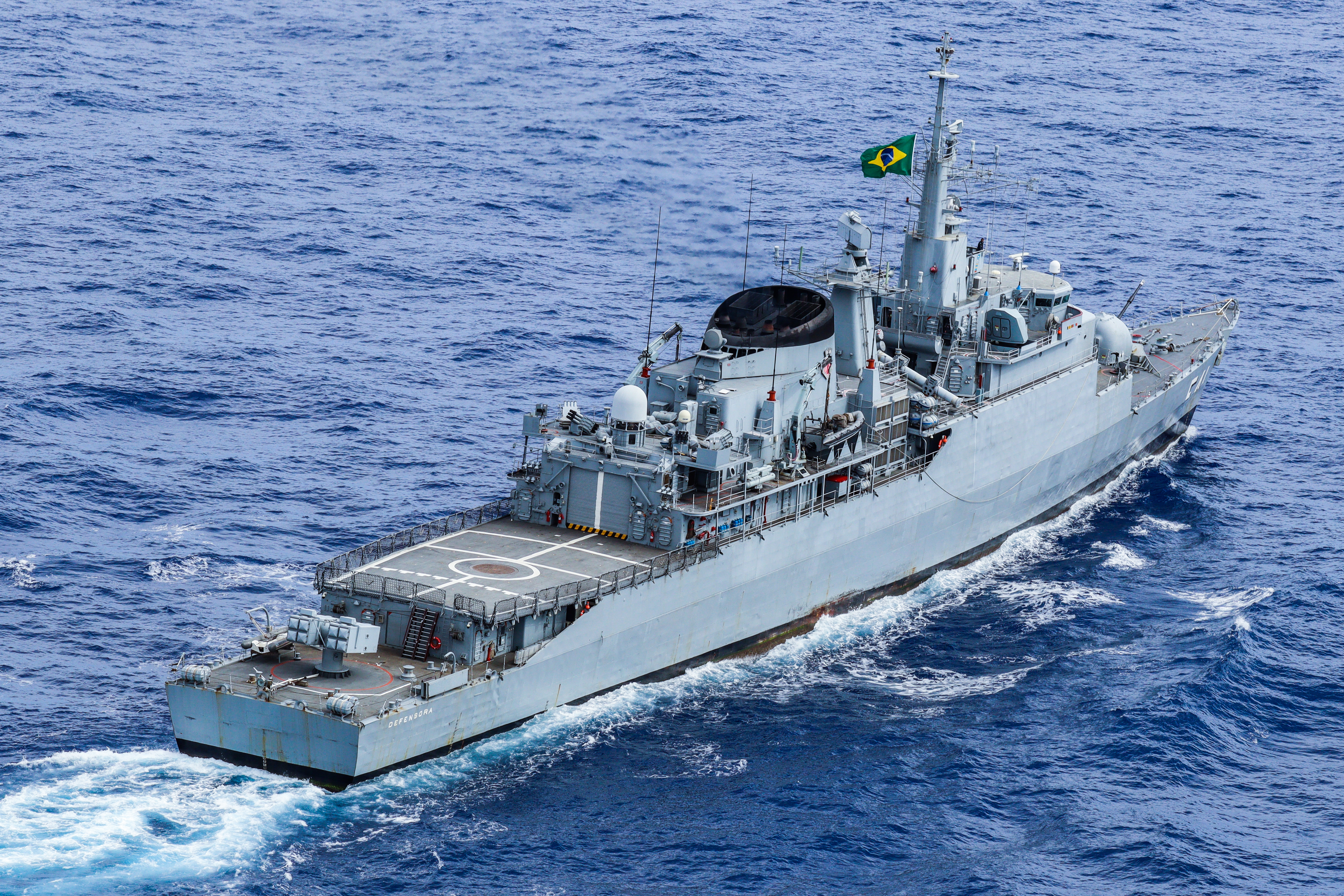
- Defensora

History
- Name: Defensora
- Namesake: Defensora
- Builder: Vosper Thornycroft
- Launched: 27 March 1975
- Christened: 14 December 1972
- Commissioned: 3 March 1977
- Home port: Rio de Janeiro
- Identification: Pennant number: F-41
- Motto: Dum defendo, oppugno; (As long as I defend, I attack); A Deusa; (The Goddess)
- Status: Active

General characteristics
- Type: Niterói-class frigate
- Displacement: 3.355 t (3.302 long tons)
- Length: 129.2 m (423 ft 11 in)
- Beam: 13.5 m (44 ft 3 in)
- Draught: 5.5 m (18 ft 1 in)
- Propulsion: CODOG, two shafts; 2 × Rolls-Royce Olympus TM-3B gas turbines 42,000 kW (56,000 hp) combined; 4 × MTU 16V 956 TB91 diesel engines 13,000 kW (17,000 hp) combined
- Speed: 30 knots (56 km/h; 35 mph) (maximum); 22 knots (41 km/h; 25 mph) (diesels only)
- Range: 5,300 nmi (9,800 km; 6,100 mi)
- Endurance: 45 days
- Complement: 217
- Sensors & processing systems: Modernized: Alenia RAN-20S air search radar; Terma Scanter surface search radar; Orion RTN-30X fire control radar; Saab EOS-400 optronic director; Krupp Atlas EDO-610E hull mounted sonar; SICONTA Mk 2 C3I system
- Electronic warfare & decoys: Modernized: Cutlass B1W ESM; ET/SQL-1 ECM; 12 × 102 mm decoy launchers
- Armament: Modernized: 1 × Albatros launcher for 8 Aspide surface-to-air missiles; 1 × 114 mm Mark 8 gun; 2 × Bofors 40 mm guns; 2 × twin launchers for Exocet anti-ship missiles; 2 × triple torpedo tubes for Mark 46 torpedoes; 1 × double-barrel Bofors Boroc anti-submarine rockets
- Aircraft carried: Westland Super Lynx Mk.21B helicopter
- Aviation facilities: Helipad and hangar

Defensora (F41) is a Niterói-class frigate of the Brazilian Navy. The Defensora was the second ship of her class ordered by the Brazilian Navy, on 20 September 1970. Defensora was launched on 14 December 1972, and was commissioned on 3 March 1977.

== History ==
F Defensora was modernized in June 2000, receiving improvements particularly in the sensor and armament systems, returning to active service in August 2003. Afterwards the vessel is proudly nicknamed “The Goddess” for its crew.

The Navy Arsenal of Rio de Janeiro carried out, on 13 July, the shipment of the last two propulsion engines in the Defensora, submitted to the W6 review, anticipating the goal by 15 days of the predicted. The event is an important milestone in the General Maintenance Period (PMG) of the ship, which, in 2017, was selected as one of the priority projects of the Navy.
