= Niterói-class frigate =

Brazilian frigate class

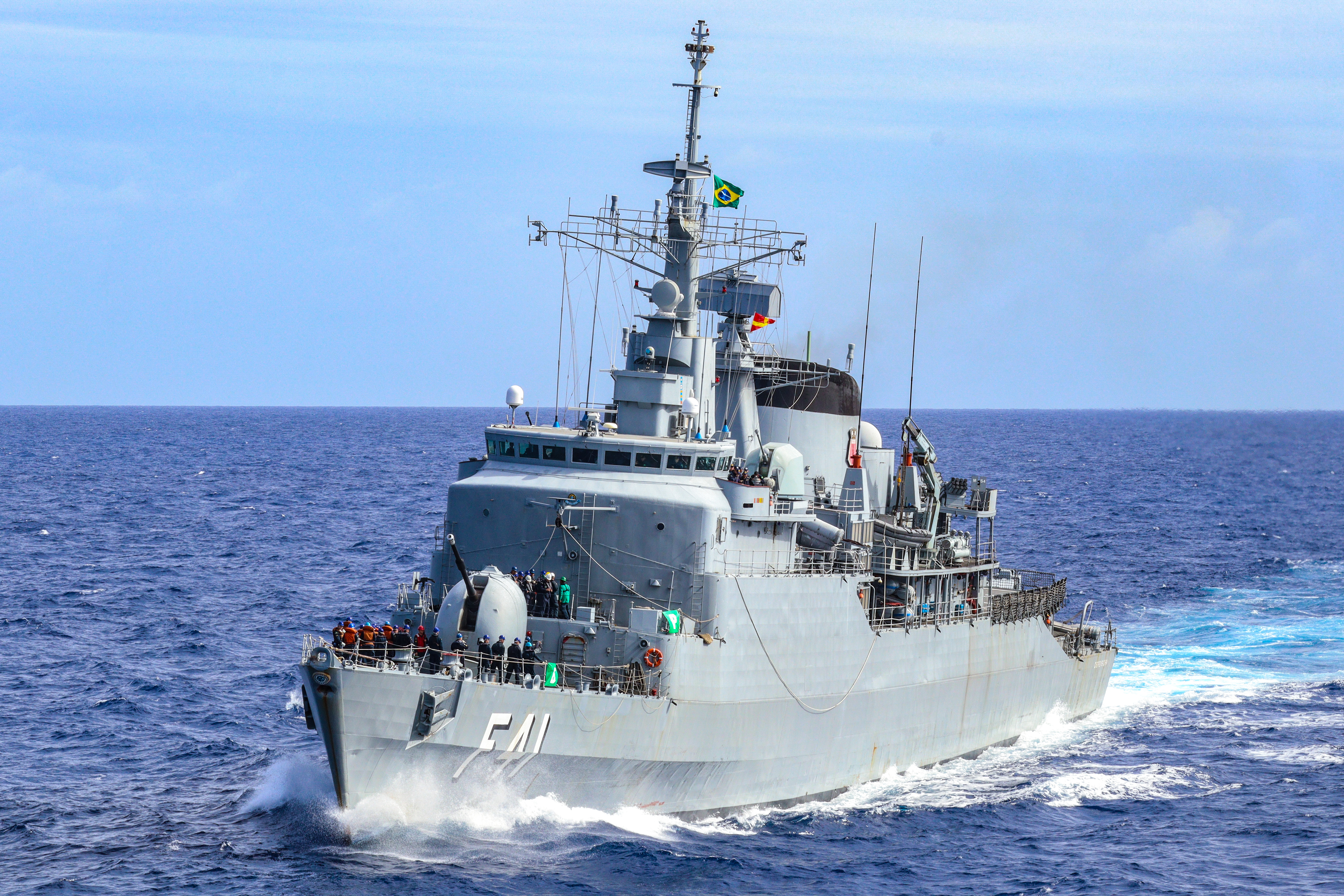
- Defensora

Class overview
- Name: Niterói class, Mk10
- Builders: Vosper Thornycroft; Rio de Janeiro Navy Arsenal
- Operators: Brazilian Navy
- Succeeded by: Tamandaré class
- Built: 1972–1986
- In commission: 1976–present
- Completed: 7
- Active: 6
- Retired: 1

General characteristics
- Type: Frigate
- Displacement: 3,355 t (3,302 long tons)
- Length: 129.2 m (423 ft 11 in)
- Beam: 13.5 m (44 ft 3 in)
- Draught: 5.5 m (18 ft 1 in)
- Propulsion: Combined diesel or gas, two shafts; 2 × Rolls-Royce Olympus TM-3B gas turbines 42000 kW (56000 hp) combined; 4 × MTU 16V 956 TB91 diesel engines 13000 kW (17000 hp) combined
- Speed: 30 knots (56 km/h; 35 mph) (maximum); 22 knots (41 km/h; 25 mph) (diesels only)
- Range: 5,300 nmi (9,800 km; 6,100 mi)
- Endurance: 45 days
- Complement: 217
- Sensors & processing systems: Modernized; Alenia RAN-20S air search radar; Terma Scanter surface search radar; Orion RTN-30X fire control radar; Saab EOS-400 optronic director; Krupp Atlas EDO-610E hull mounted sonar; SICONTA Mk 2 C3I system
- Electronic warfare & decoys: Modernized; Cutlass B1W ESM; ET/SQL-1 ECM; 12 × 102 mm decoy launchers
- Armament: Modernized; 1 × Albatros launcher for 8 Aspide surface-to-air missiles; 1 × 113 mm Mark 8 gun; 2 × Bofors 40 mm guns; 2 × twin launchers for Exocet anti-ship missiles; 2 × triple torpedo tubes for Mark 46 torpedoes; 1 × double-barrel Bofors Boroc anti-submarine rockets
- Aircraft carried: Westland Super Lynx Mk.21B helicopter
- Aviation facilities: Helipad and hangar

The Niterói class is a series of frigates of the Brazilian Navy built by Vosper Thornycroft of the United Kingdom and the Rio de Janeiro Navy Arsenal based on the Type 21 frigates.

== History ==
These frigates were designated the Mk 10 by Vosper Thornycroft and are the largest of a series of ships built by that shipyard for both foreign buyers and the Royal Navy. All of them were extensively modernized between 1996 and 2005 under the 'ModFrag' program. The projected completion was 2001, but due to lack of funds and sea trials to verify the new software, the entire program had been slipped to 2005.

A total of six ships were built. Two of the anti-submarines (ASW) and both of the general purpose (GP) version were built in England. The remaining two ASW ships were built at the Navy Arsenal in Rio de Janeiro with assistance from VT. The ASW ships had an Ikara missile launcher in Y position aft of the flight deck. This was removed as part of the modernisation programme. The GP ships had a second 4.5-inch (114 mm) gun in "Y" position. A seventh ship was built as the navy's main training unit. The ship is identical to the other ships of the class, but is not fitted with weapons or sensors.

From 2025, the class will be gradually replaced in "first-rank" roles by the newest Tamandaré-class frigates, the survivors will be revitalized and transferred to patrol duties in the fleet.

== Ships of the class ==
Name	Hull number	Builders	Type	Laid down	Launched	Commissioned	Decommissioned	Status
Niterói	F40	Vosper Thornycroft	ASW	8 June 1972	8 February 1974	20 November 1976	28 June 2019	Awaiting disposal
Defensora	F41	Vosper Thornycroft	ASW	14 December 1972	27 March 1975	3 March 1977		Active
Constituição	F42	Vosper Thornycroft	GP	13 March 1974	15 April 1976	31 March 1978		Active
Liberal	F43	Vosper Thornycroft	GP	2 May 1975	7 February 1977	18 November 1978		Active
Independência	F44	Rio de Janeiro Navy Arsenal	ASW	11 June 1972	2 September 1974	3 September 1979		Active
União	F45	Rio de Janeiro Navy Arsenal	ASW	11 June 1972	14 March 1975	12 September 1980		Active
Brasil	U27	Rio de Janeiro Navy Arsenal	Training	18 September 1981	2 September 1983	21 August 1986		Active

== Gallery ==
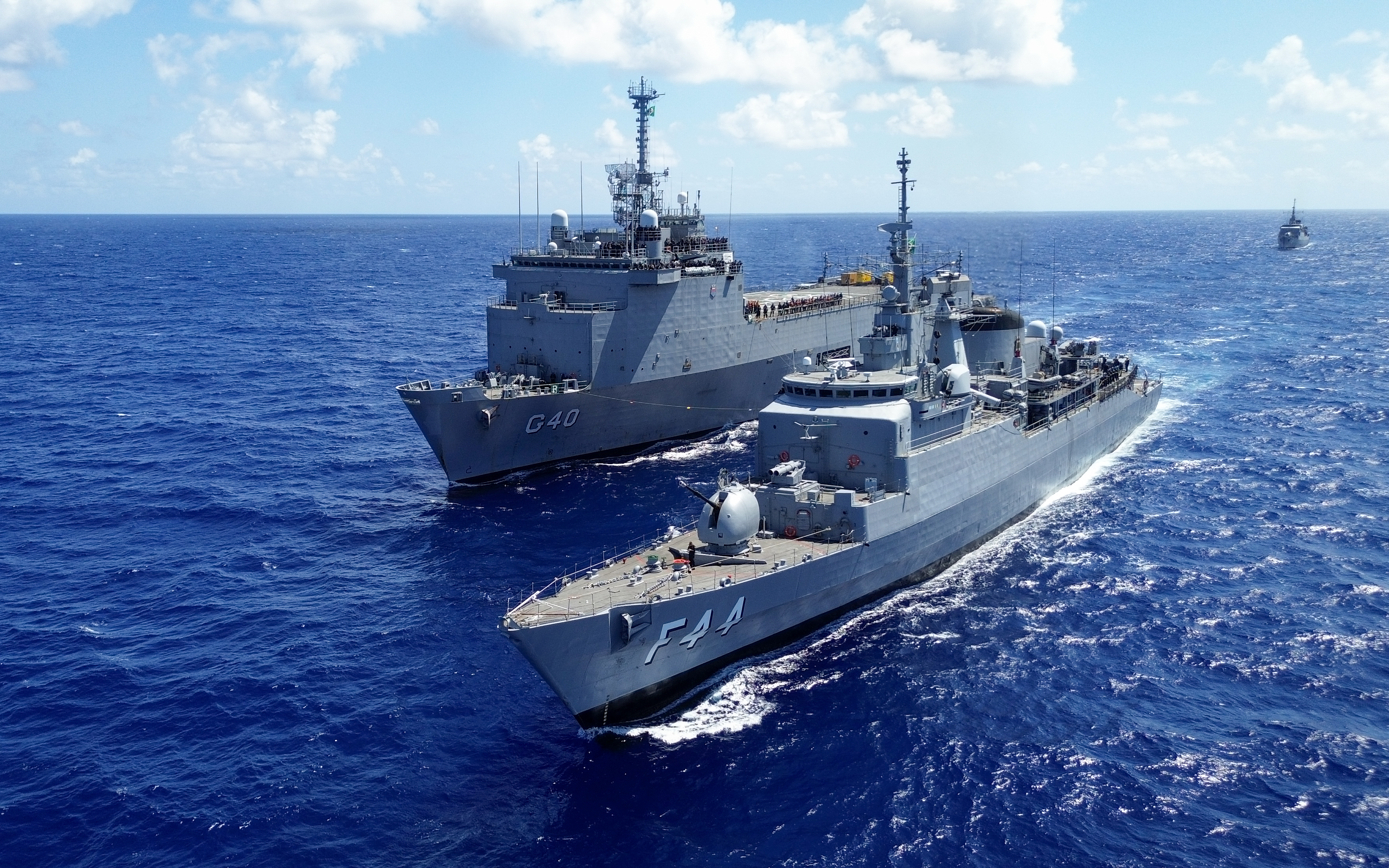
Independência and NDM Bahia

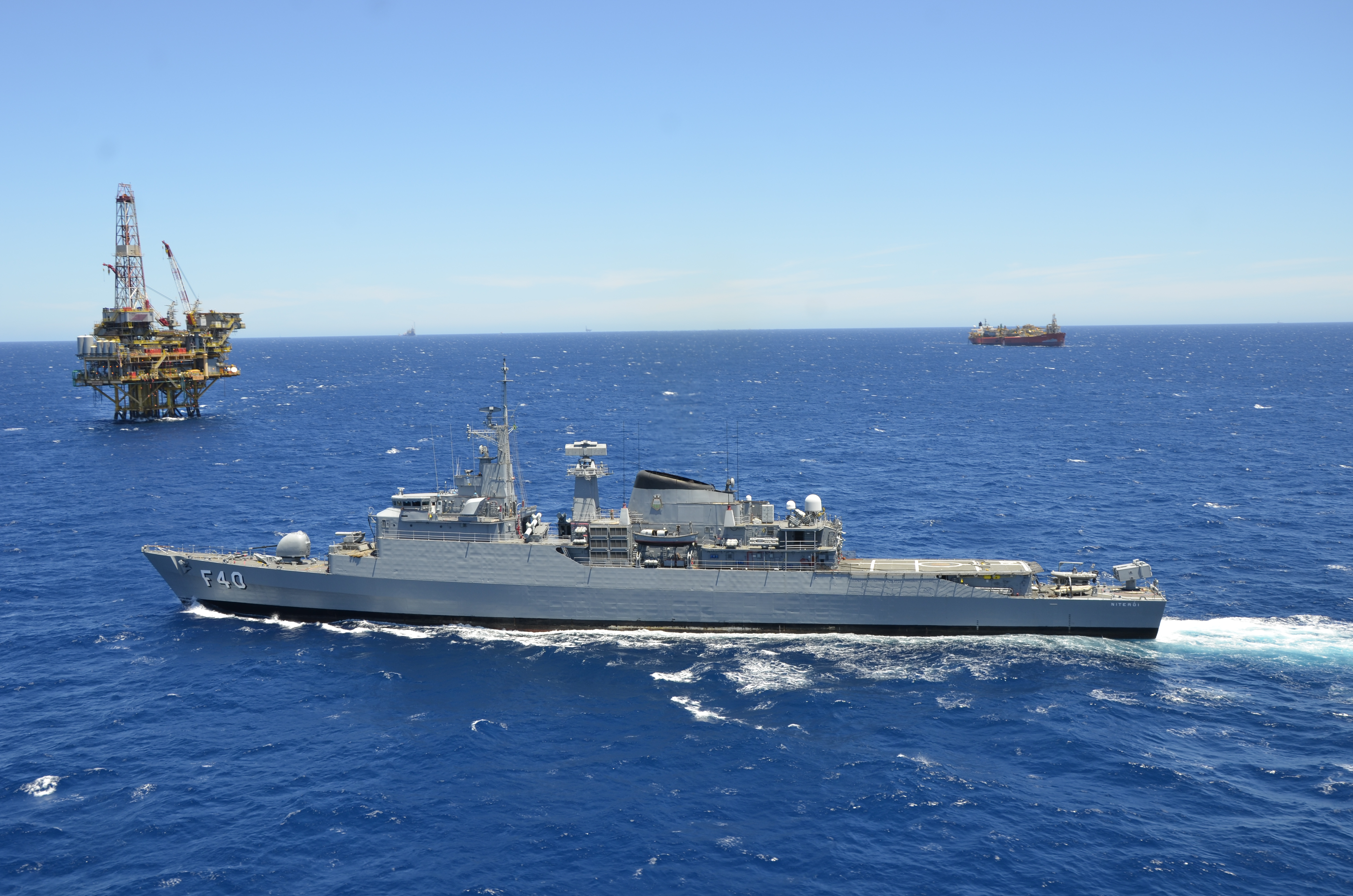
Niterói

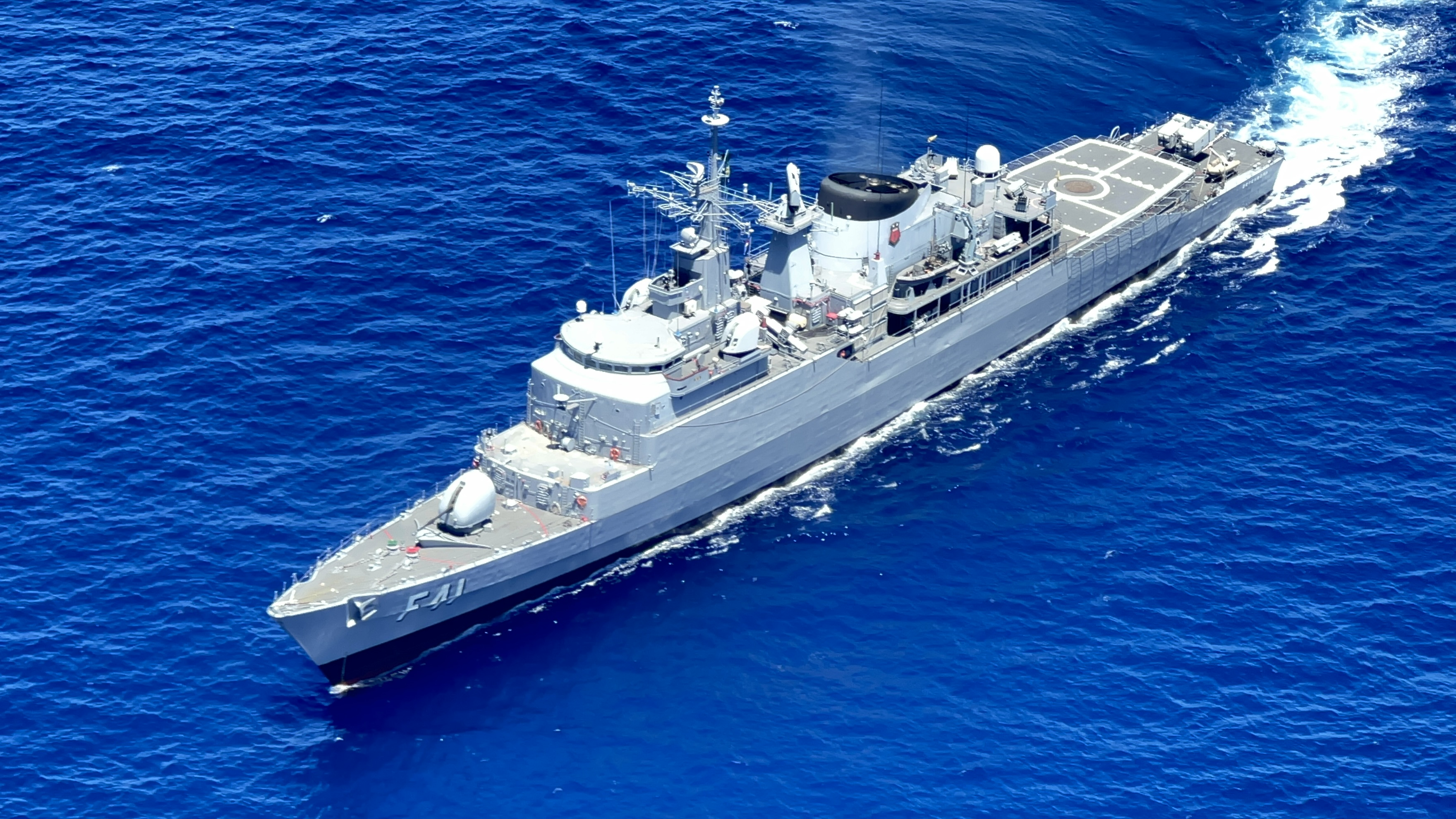
Defensora

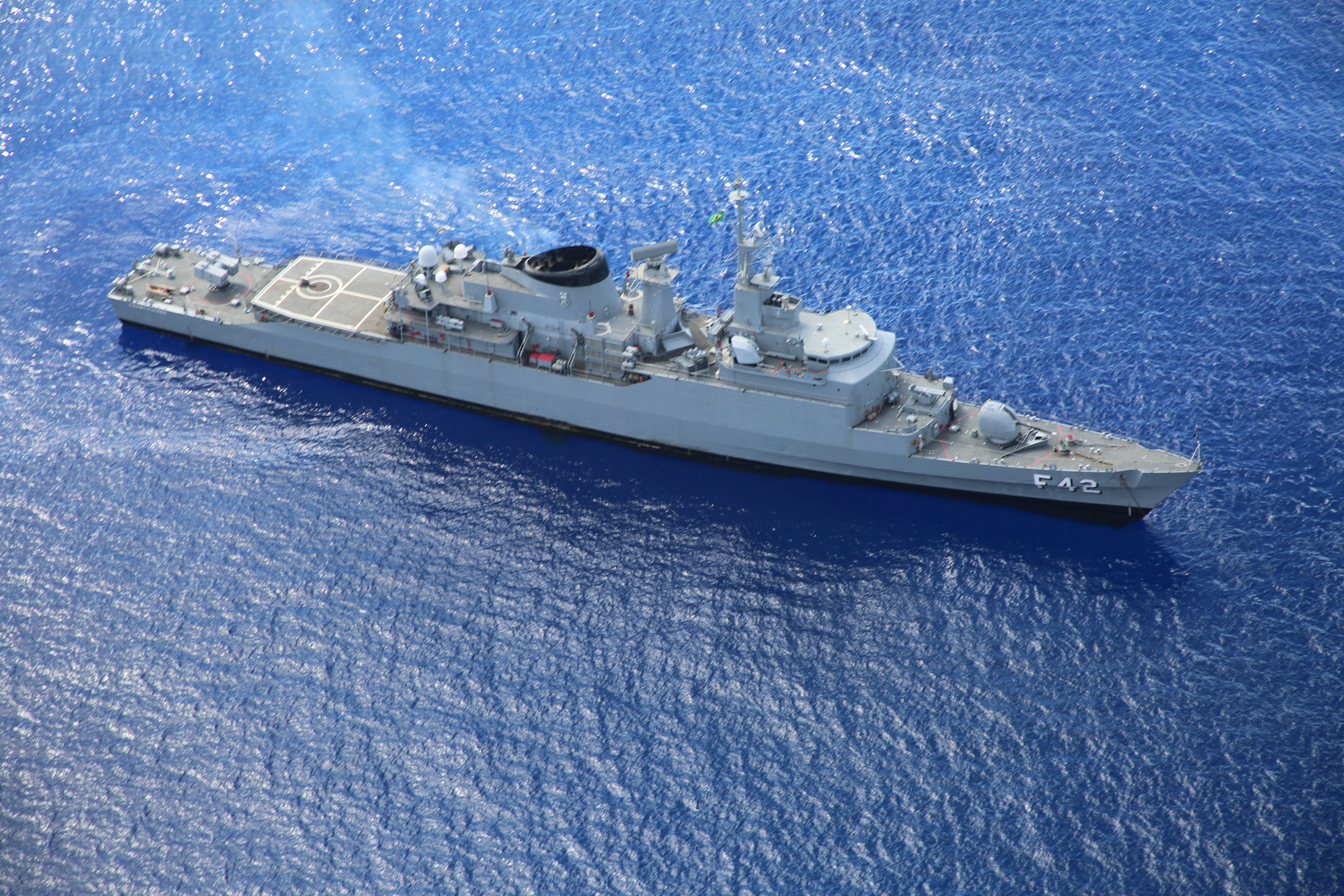
Constituição

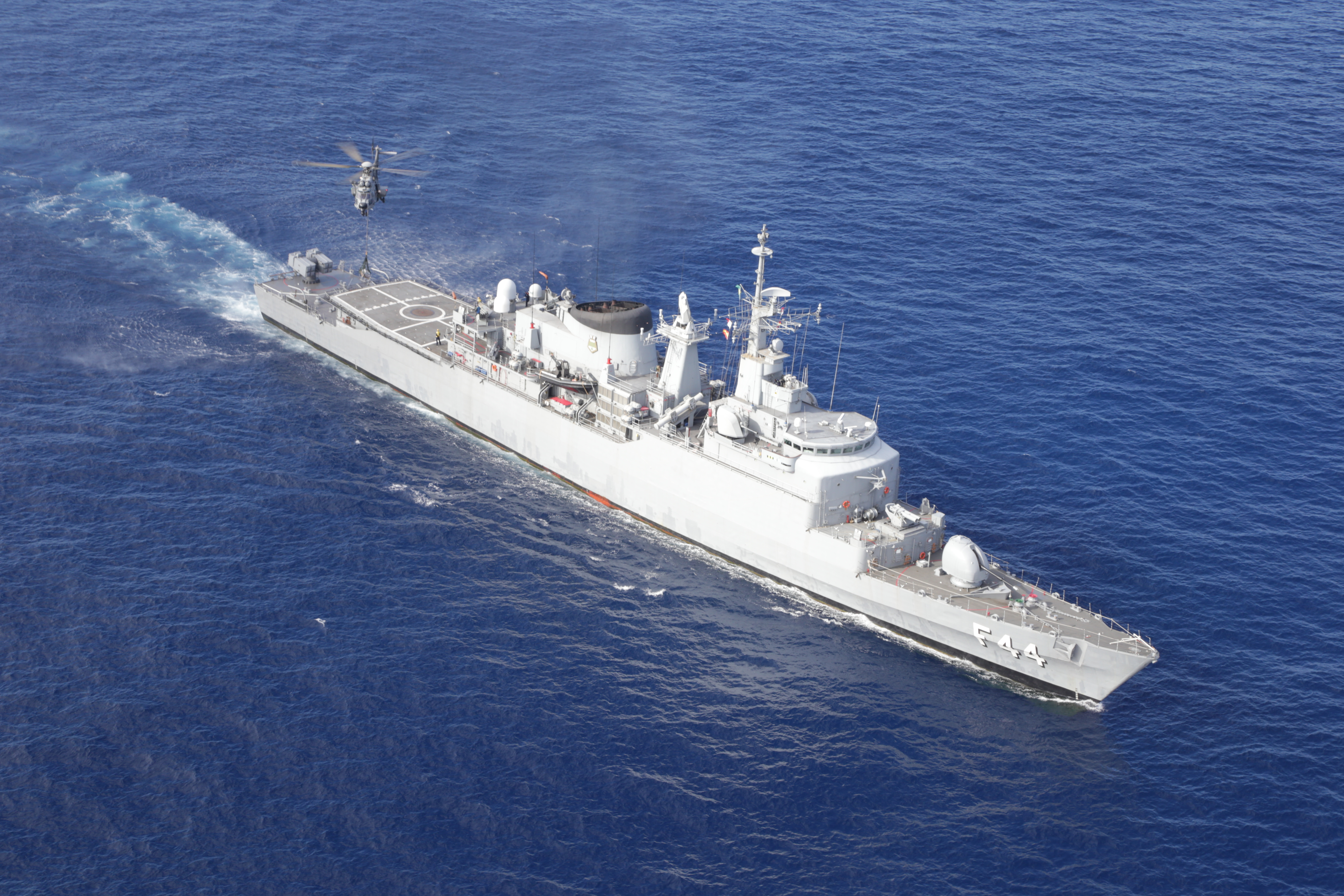
Independência

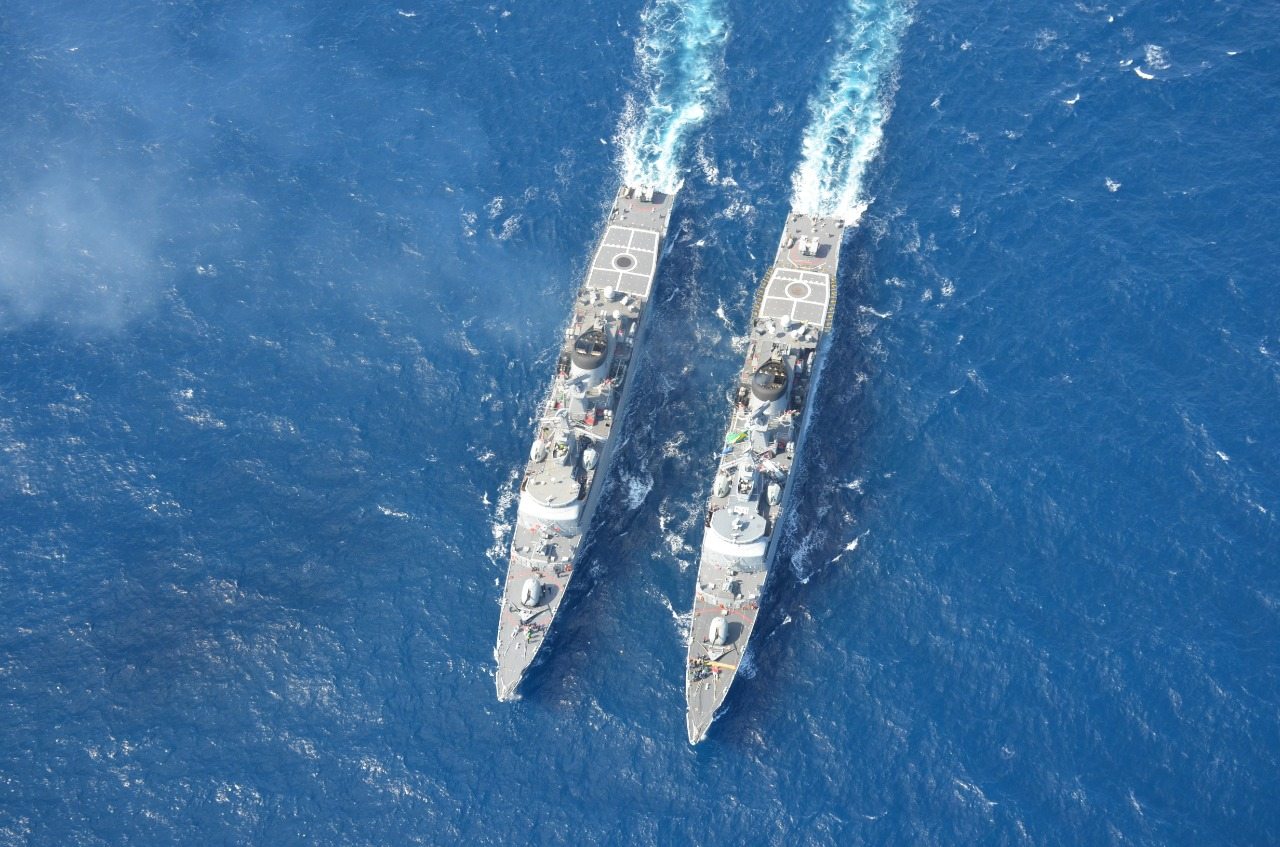
Liberal and União

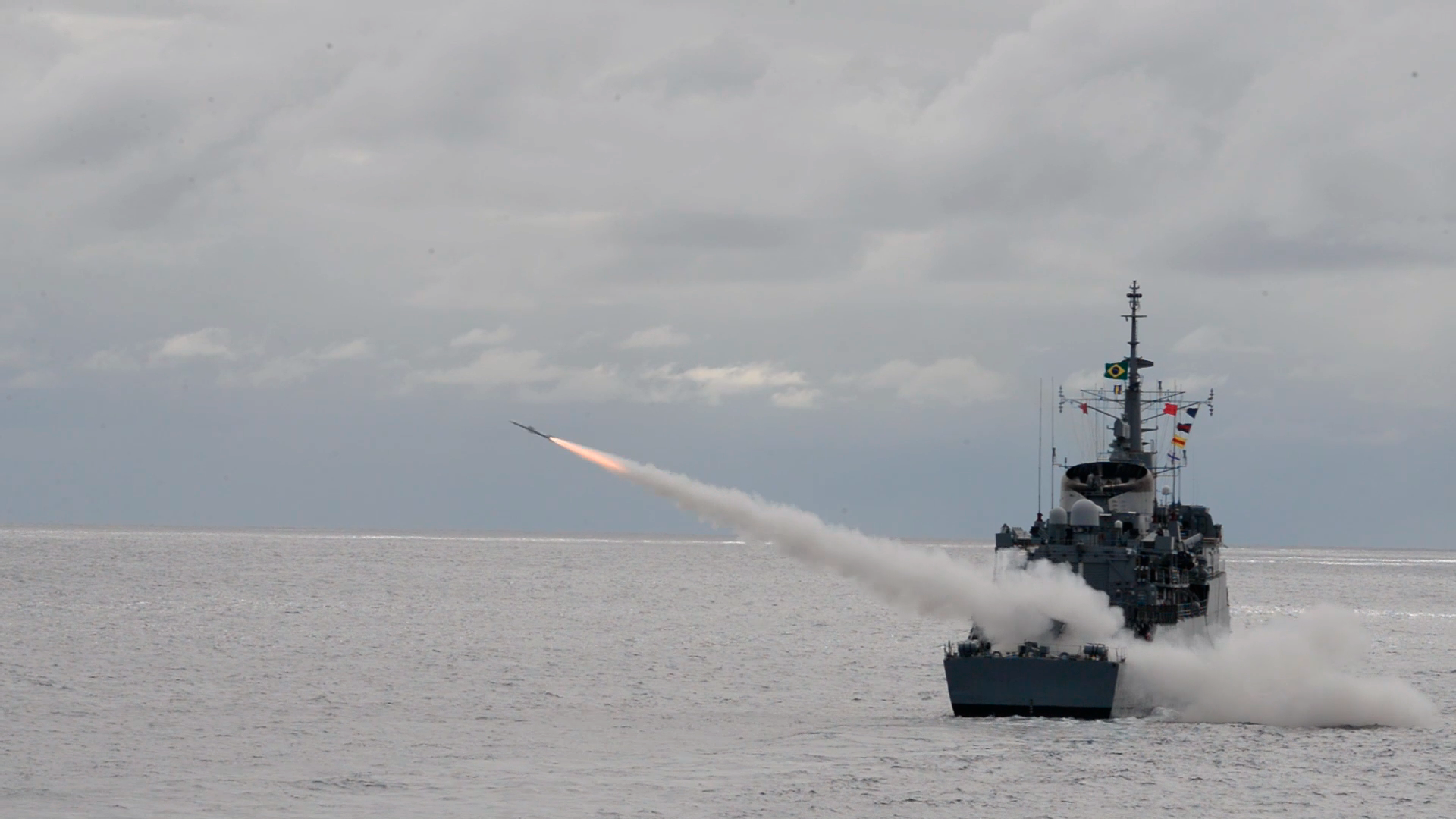
Aspide fired by Defensora

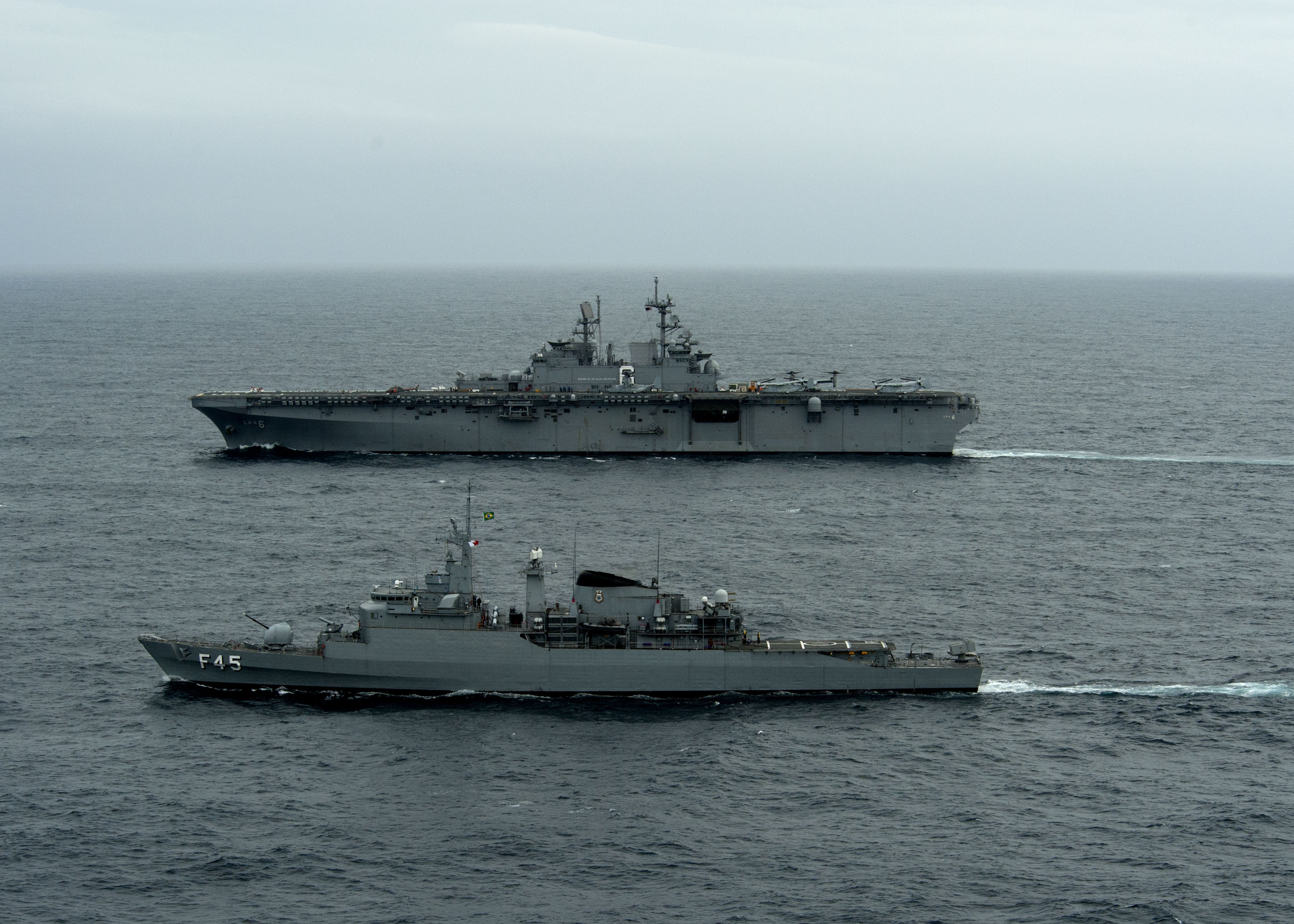
União and USS America

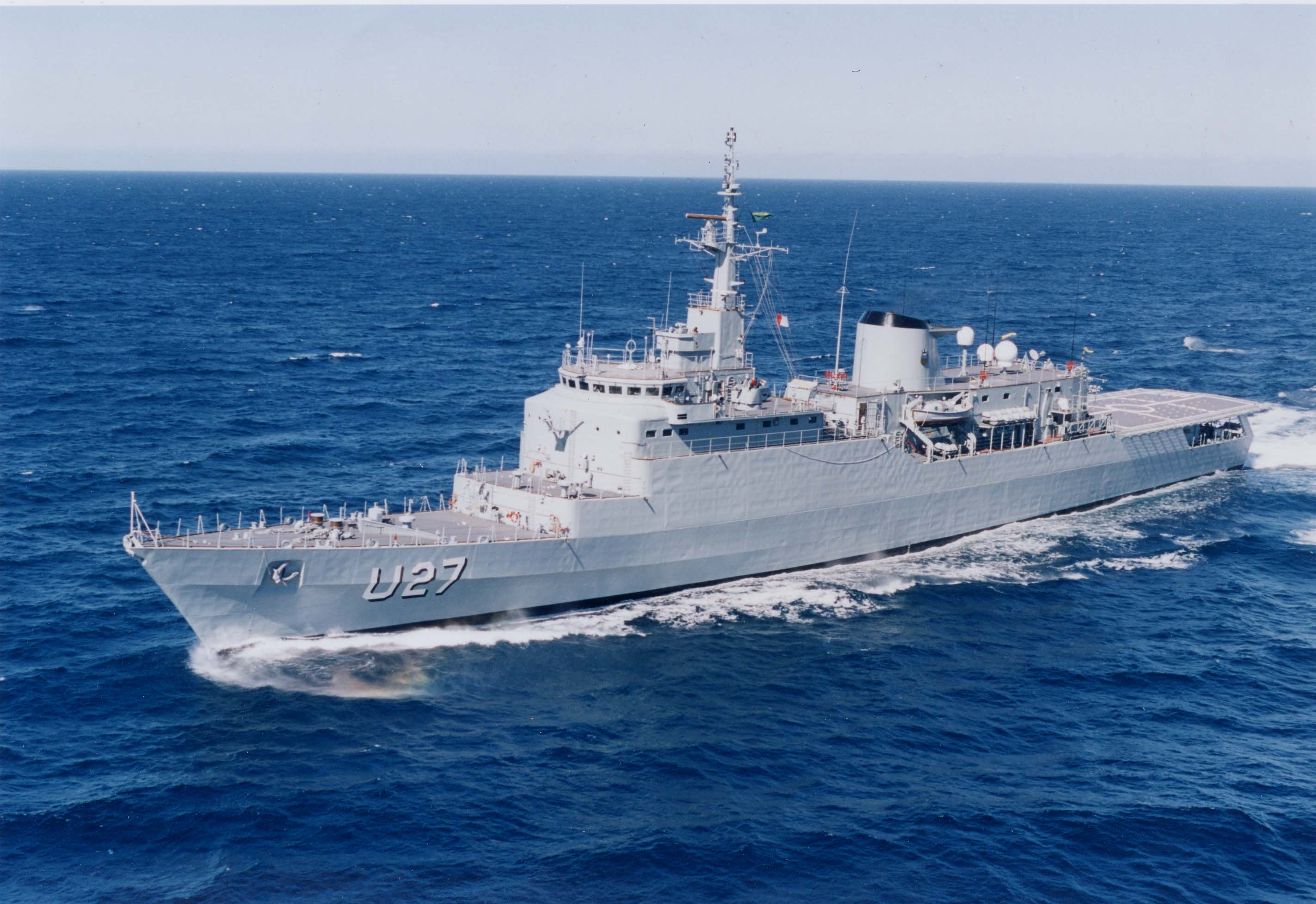
Brasil

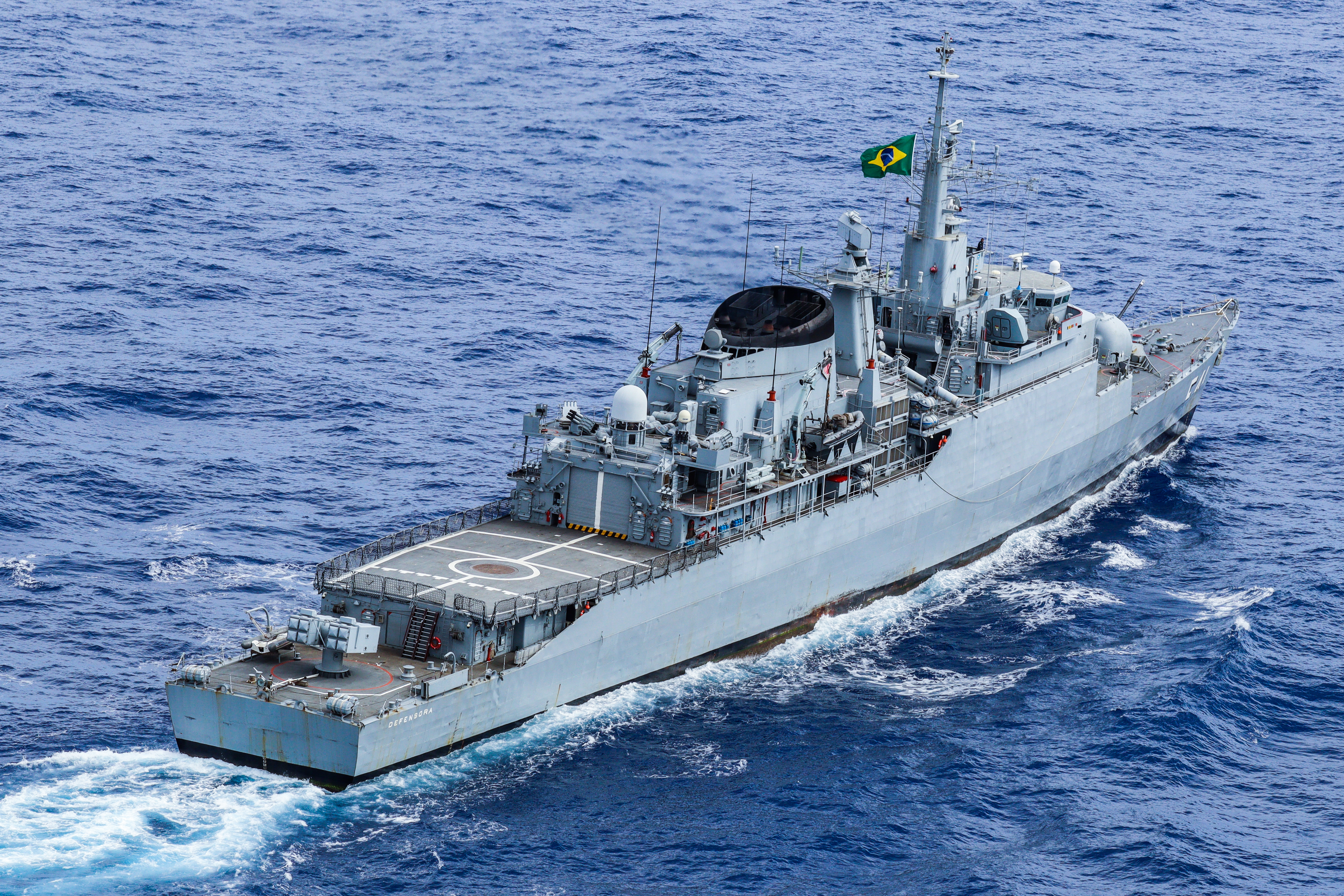
Defensora

== See also ==
Equivalent frigates of the same era

- Kortenaer class
- Bremen class
- Maestrale class
- Georges Leygues class
- Krivak class
- Knox class
