= Brazilian tanker Almirante Gastão Motta =

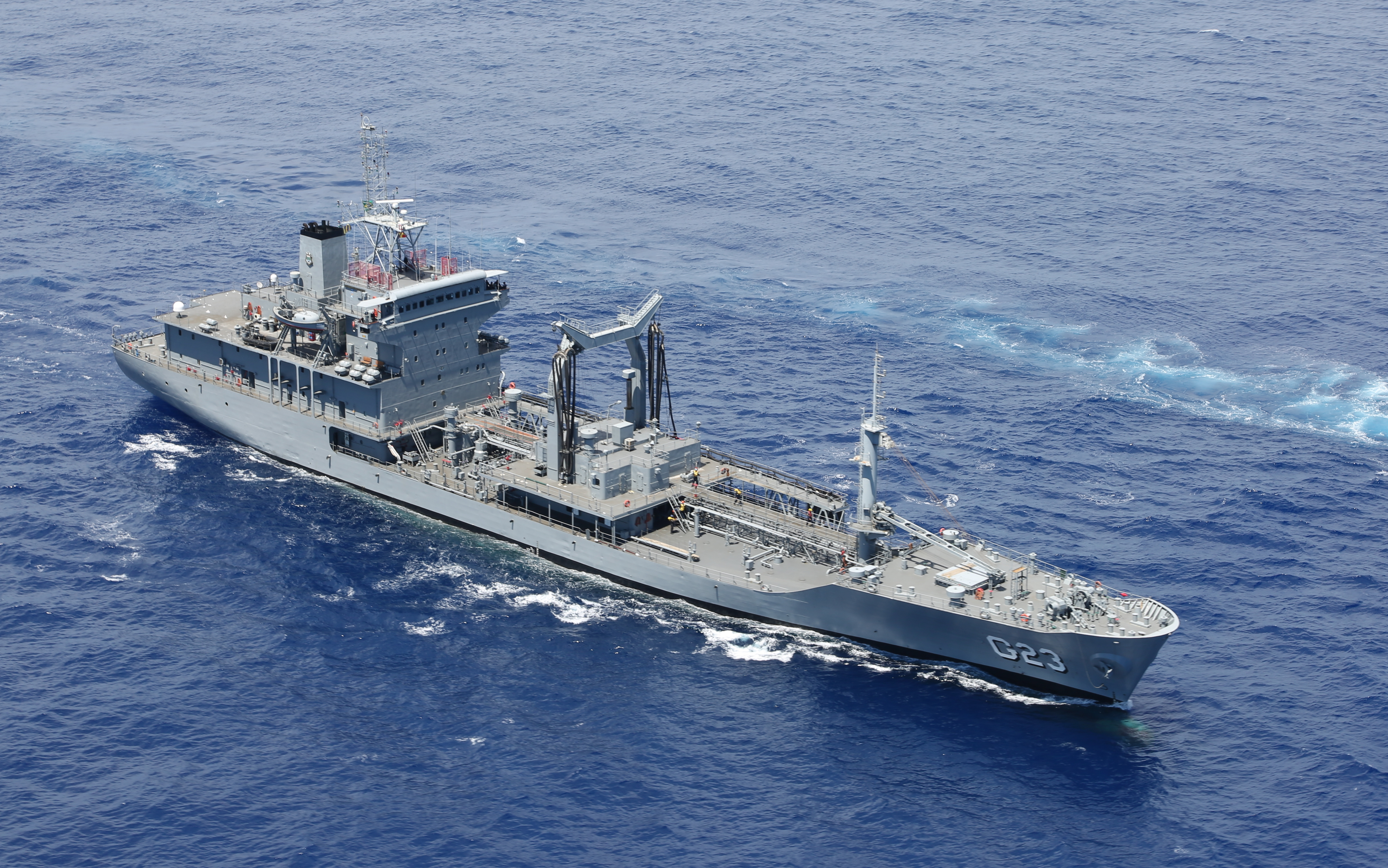
- NT Almirante Gastão Motta

History

Brazil
- Name: Almirante Gastão Motta
- Namesake: Almirante Gastão Motta
- Operator: Brazilian Navy
- Builder: Ishikawajima do Brasil Estaleiros
- Launched: 1 July 1990
- Christened: 11 December 1989
- Commissioned: 26 November 1991
- Home port: Rio de Janeiro
- Identification: IMO number: 8715558; MMSI number: 710416000; Callsign: PWGM; Pennant number: G23
- Motto: Nós fazemos a Esquadra ir mais longe; (We take the fleet farther)
- Nickname(s): São Bernardo (The Saint Bernard)
- Status: in active service

General characteristics
- Class & type: Almirante Gastão Motta-class tanker
- Displacement: 6,000 tons standard, 10,300 tons full load
- Length: 135 m (443 ft)
- Beam: 19 m (62 ft)
- Draught: 7.5 m (25 ft)
- Propulsion: 2 Wärtsilä Vasa marine diesel engines 11,700 hp
- Speed: 20.5 knots (38.0 km/h; 23.6 mph)
- Range: 10,000 nautical miles (19,000 km; 12,000 mi) at 15 knots (28 km/h; 17 mph)
- Capacity: 4,400 tons (fuel)
- Crew: 121

NT Almirante Gastão Motta is an Almirante Gastão Motta-class replenishment oiler of the Brazilian Navy. The Almirante Gastão Motta was ordered by the Brazilian Navy on 15 December 1987. The ship was launched on 1 July 1990, and was commissioned on 26 November 1991.

== History ==
In June 2009, Almirante Gastão Motta participated in the recovery mission for the wreckage of Air France Flight 447.
