= Brazilian frigate Niterói =

Niterói-class Frigates

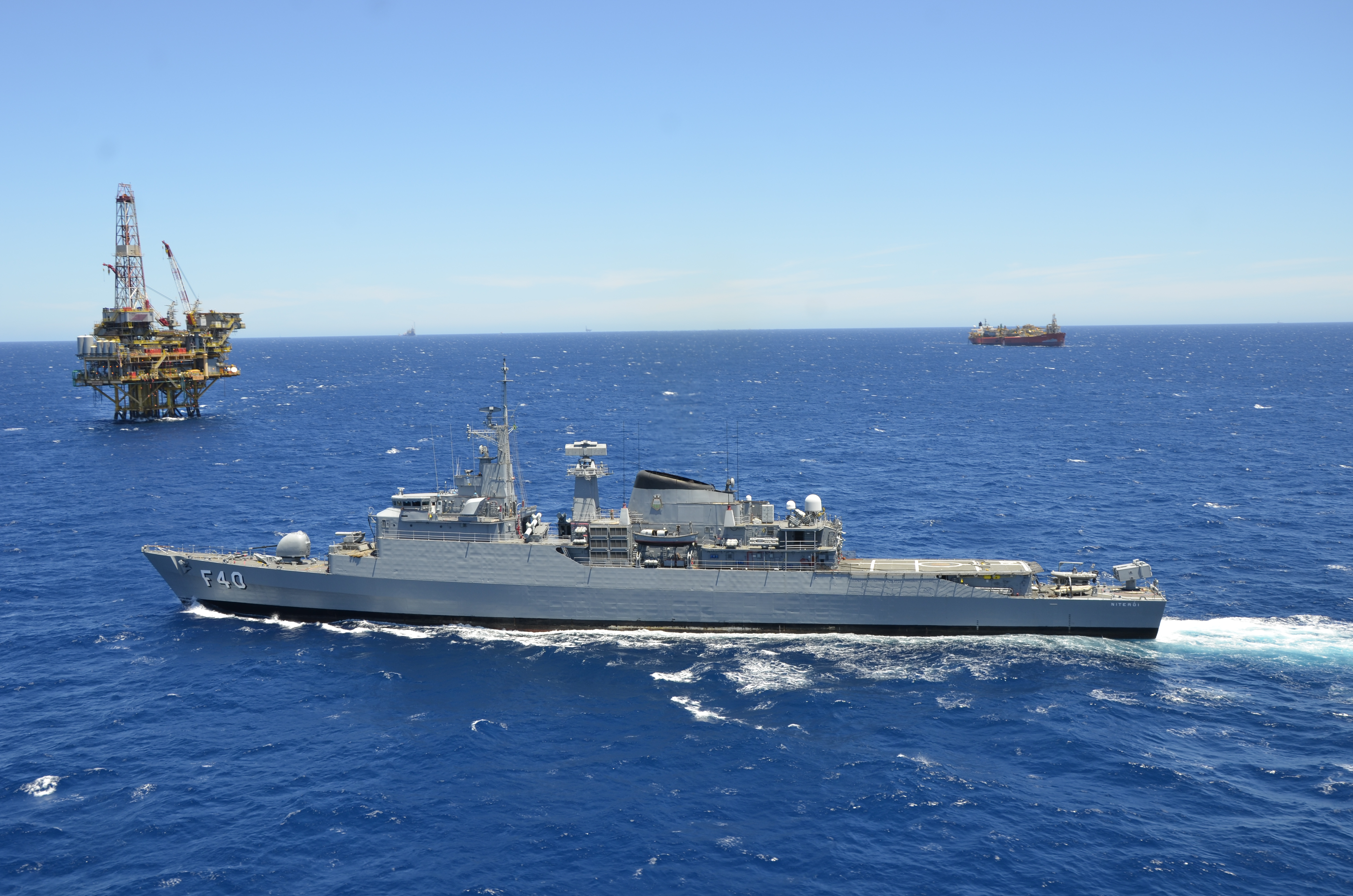
- Niterói

History

Brazil
- Name: Niterói
- Namesake: Niterói, Brazil
- Builder: Vosper Thornycroft
- Launched: 8 February 1974
- Christened: 8 June 1972
- Commissioned: 20 November 1976
- Decommissioned: 28 June 2019
- Home port: Rio de Janeiro
- Identification: Pennant number: F-40
- Status: Decommissioned

General characteristics
- Type: Niterói-class frigate
- Displacement: 3.355 t (3.302 long tons)
- Length: 129.2 m (423 ft 11 in)
- Beam: 13.5 m (44 ft 3 in)
- Draught: 5.5 m (18 ft 1 in)
- Propulsion: CODOG, two shafts; 2 × Rolls-Royce Olympus TM-3B gas turbines 42,000 kW (56,000 hp) combined; 4 × MTU 16V 956 TB91 diesel engines 13,000 kW (17,000 hp) combined
- Speed: 30 knots (56 km/h; 35 mph) (maximum); 22 knots (41 km/h; 25 mph) (diesels only)
- Range: 5,300 nmi (9,800 km; 6,100 mi)
- Endurance: 45 days
- Complement: 217
- Sensors & processing systems: Modernized: Alenia RAN-20S air search radar; Terma Scanter surface search radar; Orion RTN-30X fire control radar; Saab EOS-400 optronic director; Krupp Atlas EDO-610E hull mounted sonar; SICONTA Mk 2 C3I system
- Electronic warfare & decoys: Modernized: Cutlass B1W ESM; ET/SQL-1 ECM; 12 × 102 mm decoy launchers
- Armament: Modernized: 1 × Albatros launcher for 8 Aspide surface-to-air missiles; 1 × 114 mm Mark 8 gun; 2 × Bofors 40 mm guns; 2 × twin launchers for Exocet anti-ship missiles; 2 × triple torpedo tubes for Mark 46 torpedoes; 1 × double-barrel Bofors Boroc anti-submarine rockets
- Aircraft carried: Westland Super Lynx Mk.21B helicopter
- Aviation facilities: Helipad and hangar

Niterói (F40) was a Niterói-class frigate of the Brazilian Navy. The lead ship of her class, she was ordered by the Brazilian Navy on 20 September 1970, launched on 8 February 1974, and commissioned on 20 November 1976. She is the fifth vessel to bear the name Niterói in the history of the Brazilian Navy.

== History ==
Niterói's first modernization was completed on 8 December 2005.

From 22 April to 17 July 2015, the ship was docked at Dique Seco Almirante Campbell de Barros, where various services were performed, such as the treatment and painting of living works and the replacement of side plates.

The Brazilian Navy announced that on 8 September 2018, there was a flooding in the Niterói while she was moored at the Naval Base in Rio de Janeiro, due to damage in a salt water network. The incident was promptly tackled by the ship’s service personnel, with the support of other naval ships moored nearby. The situation was normalized, the ship being in its normal conditions of stability. There were no deaths or serious damage.

In 2019, Niterói was deactivated and discontinued due to high maintenance and preservation costs, given the vessel's time of use. On 28 June of the same year, the Frigate Disarmament Exhibition was held.

== Bibliography ==
- Scheina, Robert L. & Smigielski, Adam (1995). "Brazil". In Chumbley, Stephen (ed.). Conway's All the World's Fighting Ships, 1947–1995 (revised ed.). Naval Institute Press. pp. 29–36. ISBN 1-55750-132-7.
