= List of ship launches in 1969 =

The list of ship launches in 1969 includes a chronological list of ships launched in 1969. In cases where no official launching ceremony was held, the date built or completed may be used instead.

Date	Ship	Class and type	Builder	Location	Country	Notes
1 January	Milwaukee	Wichita-class replenishment oiler	Fore River Shipyard	Quincy, Massachusetts	United States	For United States Navy
4 January	Blue Ridge	Blue Ridge-class command ship	Philadelphia Naval Shipyard	Philadelphia	United States	For United States Navy
4 January	Manitowoc	Newport-class tank landing ship	Philadelphia Naval Shipyard	Philadelphia	United States	For United States Navy
4 January	St. Louis	Charleston-class amphibious cargo ship	Newport News Shipbuilding	Newport News	United States	For United States Navy
4 January	W. S. Sims	Knox-class frigate	Avondale Shipyard	Avondale	United States	For United States Navy
16 January	P.A.S. 1506	Tanker barge	Appledore Shipbuilders Ltd.	Appledore	United Kingdom	For Royal Maritime Auxiliary Service.
20 January	Oilwell	Naval tanker	Appledore Shipbuilders Ltd.	Appledore	United Kingdom	For Royal Maritime Auxiliary Service.
January	Kawkab	Kawkab-class patrol craft	Keith, Nelson & Co.	Bembridge	United Kingdom	For United Arab Emirates Navy.
January	Thoaban	Kawkab-class patrol craft	Keith, Nelson & Co.	Bembridge	United Kingdom	For United Arab Emirates Navy.
1 February	Rommel	Lütjens-class destroyer	Bath Iron Works	Bath, Maine	United States	For United States Navy
2 February	Schleswig-Holstein	ferry			United States	For Reederei & Schiffahrts GmbH Grüne Küstenstraße
18 February	Oilman	Naval tanker	Appledore Shipbuilders Ltd.	Appledore	United Kingdom	For Royal Maritime Auxiliary Service.
3 March	P.A.S. 1507	Tank barge	Appledore Shipbuilders Ltd.	Appledore	United Kingdom	For Royal Maritime Auxiliary Service.
5 March	Vortigern	Combined train and RO-RO ferry	Swan Hunter	Wallsend	United Kingdom	For British Railways Board
6 March	Hoveringham IV	Dredger	Appledore Shipbuilders Ltd.	Appledore	United Kingdom	For Hoveringham Gravels Ltd.
8 March	Frederick	Newport-class tank landing ship	National Steel and Shipbuilding Company	San Diego, California	United States	United States
18 March	Aino	Bulk carrier	Harland & Wolff	Belfast	United Kingdom	For C. H. Sorensen.
March	Maria Van Riebeeck	Daphné-class submarine	Dubegion-Normandie	Nantes	France	For South African Navy
2 April	Husky	Dog-class tug	Appledore Shipbuilders Ltd.	Appledore	United Kingdom	For Royal Maritime Auxiliary Service.
3 April	Helen Miller	Cargo ship	Burntisland Shipbuilding Company	Burntisland	United Kingdom	For St. Vincent Shipping Co.
3 April	Sand Swan	Dredger	J. Bolson & Son Ltd.	Poole	United Kingdom	For South Coast Shipping Co. Ltd.
12 April	Hawkbill	Sturgeon-class submarine	Mare Island Naval Shipyard	Vallejo, California	United States	For United States Navy
15 April	Diomede	Leander-class frigate	Yarrows	Scotstoun	United Kingdom	For Royal Navy
15 April	Admiral Nakhimov	Project 1134A Berkut A large anti-submarine ship	Severnaya Verf	Leningrad	Soviet Union	For Soviet Navy
21 April	Garian	Patrol boat	Brooke Marine Ltd.	Lowestoft	United Kingdom	For Libyan Navy.
29 April	Annie Johnson	Container ship	Wärtsilä Helsinki Shipyard	Helsinki	Finland	Rederi AB Nordstjernan
2 May	Rathburne	Knox-class frigate	Lockheed	Seattle, Washington	United States	For United States Navy
3 May	Harold E. Holt	Knox-class frigate	Todd Shipyards	San Pedro, California	United States	For United States Navy
3 May	Patterson	Knox-class frigate	Avondale Shipyard	Avondale	United States	For United States Navy
15 May	Saluki	Dog-class tug	Appledore Shipbuilders Ltd.	Appledore	United Kingdom	For Royal Maritime Auxiliary Service.
16 May	Brackengarth	Firefighting tug	Appledore Shipbuilders Ltd.	Appledore	United Kingdom	For Rea Towing Co. Ltd.
17 May	El Paso	Charleston-class amphibious cargo ship	Newport News Shipbuilding	Newport News	United States	For United States Navy
17 May	Flying Fish	Sturgeon-class submarine	Electric Boat	Groton, Connecticut	United States	For United States Navy
24 May	Inchon	Iwo Jima-class amphibious assault ship	Ingalls Shipbuilding	Pascagoula, Mississippi	United States	For United States Navy
24 May	Schenectady	Newport-class tank landing ship	National Steel and Shipbuilding Company	San Diego, California	United States	For United States Navy
29 May	Khawlan	Patrol boat	Brooke Marine Ltd.	Lowestoft	United Kingdom	For Libyan Navy.
1 June	Kansas City	Wichita-class replenishment oiler	Fore River Shipyard	Quincy, Massachusetts	United States	For United States Navy
3 June	Störtebeker	Ferry			United States	For Wyker Dampfschiffs-Reederei Amrum GmbH
14 June	Vreeland	Knox-class frigate	Avondale Shipyard	Avondale	United States	For United States Navy
21 June	Detroit	Sacramento-class fast combat support ship	Puget Sound Naval Shipyard	Bremerton, Washington	United States	For United States Navy
27 June	Hoveringham V	Dredger	Appledore Shipbuilders Ltd.	Appledore	United Kingdom	For Hoveringham Gravels Ltd.
30 June	Bristol	Type 82 destroyer	Swan Hunter	Wallsend	United Kingdom	For Royal Navy
1 July	Mormacsun	Roll-on/roll-off vessel	Ingalls Shipbuilding	Pascagoula, Mississippi	United States	Moore-McCormack Lines
12 July	Cayuga	Newport-class tank landing ship	National Steel and Shipbuilding Company	San Diego, California	United States	For United States Navy
31 July	Setter	Dog-class tug	Appledore Shipbuilders Ltd.	Appledore	United Kingdom	For Royal Maritime Auxiliary Service.
July	Shushuk	Daphné-class submarine		Toulon	France	For Pakistani Navy
July	Bani Yas	Kawkab-class patrol craft	Keith, Nelson & Co.	Bembridge	United Kingdom	For United Arab Emirates Navy.
16 August	Pintado	Sturgeon-class submarine	Mare Island Naval Shipyard	Vallejo, California	United States	
18 August	Conqueror	Churchill-class submarine	Cammell Laird	Birkenhead	United Kingdom	For Royal Navy
23 August	Blakely	Knox-class frigate	Avondale Shipyard	Avondale	United States	For United States Navy
3 September	Sabratha	Patrol boat	Brooke Marine Ltd.	Lowestoft	United Kingdom	For Libyan Navy.
6 September	Tuscaloosa	Newport-class tank landing ship	National Steel and Shipbuilding Company	San Diego, California	United States	For United States Navy
15 September	Sheepdog	Dog-class tug	Appledore Shipbuilders Ltd.	Appledore	United Kingdom	For Royal Maritime Auxiliary Service.
25 September	Hollygarth	Firefighting tug	Appledore Shipbuilders Ltd.	Appledore	United Kingdom	For Rea Towing Co. Ltd.
27 September	Trepang	Sturgeon-class submarine	Electric Boat	Groton, Connecticut	United States	For United States Navy
27 September	Acadia Forest	Lighter aboard ship	Sumitomo Heavy Industries	Yokohama	Japan	First LASH-ship in the world
14 October	Brunswick	Edenton-class salvage and rescue ship	Brooke Marine Ltd.	Lowestoft	United Kingdom	For United States Navy.
23 October	Marvin Shields	Knox-class frigate	Todd Pacific Shipyards	Seattle, Washington	United States	For United States Navy
24 October	Emily Hobhouse	Daphné-class submarine			France	For South African Navy
25 October	Merawa	Patrol boat	Brooke Marine Ltd.	Lowestoft	United Kingdom	For Libyan Navy.
25 October	Fort Sainte Marie	Fruit carrier	Ateliers et Chantiers de Dunkerque-Bordeaux	Dunkirk	France	For Compagnie Générale Transatlantique
October	690	Barge	Alabama Drydock and Shipbuilding Company	Mobile, Alabama	United States	For St. Charles Dredging & Towing.
October	691	Barge	Alabama Drydock and Shipbuilding Company	Mobile, Alabama	United States	For St. Charles Dredging & Towing.
1 November	Trippe	Knox-class frigate	Avondale Shipyard	Avondale	United States	For United States Navy
11 November	Sand Lance	Sturgeon-class submarine	Newport News Shipbuilding	Newport News	United States	For United States Navy
15 November	Murakumo	Minegumo-class destroyer			Japan	For Japan Self-Defence Forces
20 November	P.A.S. 1604	Tank barge	Appledore Shipbuilders Ltd.	Appledore	United Kingdom	For Royal Maritime Auxiliary Service.
2 December	Song of Norway	Song of Norway-class cruise ship			Finland	Royal Caribbean Cruise Lines
12 December	Downes	Knox-class frigate	Todd Pacific Shipyards	Seattle, Washington	United States	For United States Navy
12 December	Terrible	Redoutable-class submarine	DCAN		France	For French Navy
13 December	Sumter	Newport-class tank landing ship	Philadelphia Naval Shipyard	Philadelphia	United States	For United States Navy
13 December	San Jose	Mars-class combat stores ship	National Steel and Shipbuilding Company	San Diego, California	United States	For United States Navy
14 December	Lindblad Explorer	Cruise ship	Uudenkaupungin Telakka	Uusikaupunki	Finland	For K/S A/S Explorer & Co, Oslo, Norway
18 December	Nordkaperen	Type 205 submarine	Orlogsværftet	Copenhagen	Denmark	For Royal Danish Navy
19 December	Apollo	Ferry	Meyer Werft	Papenburg	West Germany	For Rederi AB Slite / Viking Line
20 December	Portland	Anchorage-class dock landing ship	Fore River Shipyard,	Quincy, Massachusetts	United States	For United States Navy
Unknown date	Libation	Coaster.	Crescent Shipping	Frindsbury	United Kingdom	For Crescent Shipping Ltd.
Unknown date	Lobe	Motor barge	Bay Wharf Construction Co. Ltd.	Greenwich	United Kingdom	For London & Rochester Trading Co. Ltd.
Unknown date	Lundy Puffin	Fishing trawler	Appledore Shipbuilders Ltd.	Appledore	United Kingdom	For Appledore Shipbuilders Ltd.
Unknown date	Naruto Maru	ro-ro ferry	Taguma Shipbuilding	Onomichi	Japan	
