= List of ship commissionings in 1969 =

The list of ship commissionings in 1969 includes a chronological list of all ships commissioned in 1969.

	Operator	Ship	Flag	Class and type	Pennant	Other notes
20 January	Trave Lines	Sveaborg	Sweden	Ferry		Formerly Finnpartner with Finnlines
22 February	Royal Australian Navy	Bayonet		Attack-class patrol boat	P 101	
12 March	Argentine Navy	Veinticinco de Mayo		Colossus-class aircraft carrier	V-2	Former HNLMS Karel Doorman
15 March	United States Navy	Anchorage		Anchorage-class dock landing ship	LSD-36	
22 March	German Navy	Lütjens		Lütjens-class destroyer	D185	
18 April	Royal Australian Navy	Ovens		Oberon-class submarine	S 70	
April	Swedish Lloyd	Hispania	Sweden	Ferry		Formerly Svea with Rederi AB Svea
24 May	United States Navy	Durham		Charleston-class amphibious cargo ship	LKA-114	
2 June	Royal Navy	Charybdis		Leander-class frigate	F75	
7 June	United States Navy	Newport		Newport-class tank landing ship	LST-1179	
11 July	Royal Navy	Hermione		Leander-class frigate	F58	
12 July	United States Navy	Juneau		Austin-class amphibious transport dock	LPD-10	
9 August	Royal Navy	Jupiter		Leander-class frigate	F60	
20 September	German Navy	Mölders		Lütjens-class destroyer	D186	
20 September	United States Navy	Mobile		Charleston-class amphibious cargo ship	LKA-115	
17 October	Royal Navy	Bacchante		Leander-class frigate	F69	
14 December	K/S A/S Explorer & Co	Lindblad Explorer	Liberia	Expeditionary cruise ship		
22 December	Royal Australian Navy	Onslow		Oberon-class submarine	S 60	
29 December	Soviet Navy	Kronstadt		Project 1134A Berkut A large anti-submarine ship	585	

== Bibliography ==
- Preston, Antony (1995). "United Kingdom". In Chumbley, Stephen (ed.). Conway's All The World's Fighting Ships 1947–1995. Annapolis, Maryland: Naval Institute Press. pp. 479–543. ISBN 1-55750-132-7.
