= USS El Paso =

USS El Paso has been the name of two ships in the United States Navy. Both are named for the city of El Paso, Texas.

- USS El Paso (PF-41), a Tacoma-class frigate commissioned in 1943 and decommissioned in 1946.
- USS El Paso (LKA-117), a Charleston-class amphibious cargo ship, commissioned in 1970 and decommissioned in 1994.
