= USS Charleston (LKA-113) =

1967 Charleston-class amphibious cargo ship

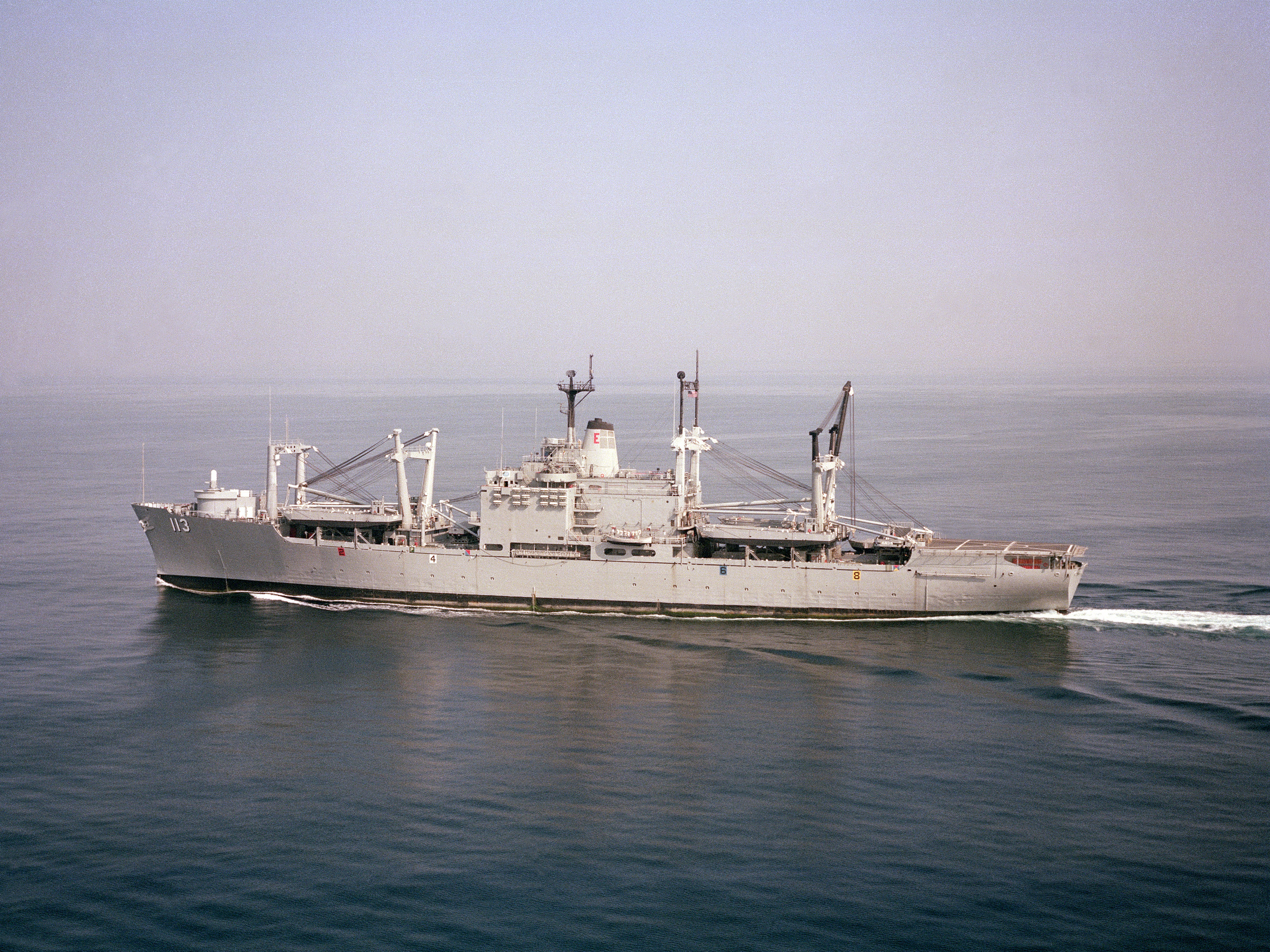
- USS Charleston (LKA-113) in 1987

History

United States
- Name: USS Charleston
- Namesake: Charleston, South Carolina
- Ordered: 11 June 1965
- Builder: Newport News Shipbuilding and Dry Dock Co.
- Laid down: 5 December 1966
- Launched: 2 December 1967
- Commissioned: 14 December 1968
- Decommissioned: 27 April 1992
- Stricken: 31 August 2015
- Home port: Norfolk, VA
- Nickname(s): "Chuckie" or "The Chuck"
- Fate: being sent to scrappers

General characteristics
- Class & type: Charleston-class amphibious cargo ship
- Displacement: 18,465 tons (full load)
- Length: 576 ft (176 m)
- Beam: 82 ft (25 m)
- Draft: 26 ft (7.9 m)
- Propulsion: Steam Turbine
- Boats & landing craft carried: LCM, LCVP, motor whale boat
- Complement: 50 officers, 592 men
- Armament: As built; 4 × twin 3-inch/50-caliber guns; Later fitted; 2 x 20mm Phalanx CIWS

Service record
- Operations: Vietnam War, Desert Storm

USS Charleston (AKA-113/LKA-113) was an amphibious cargo ship, and was the lead ship of her class in the United States Navy. She was the fifth ship to be named Charleston for Charleston, South Carolina. She served as a commissioned ship for 23 years and 4 months.

She was laid down as AKA-113 at Newport News Shipbuilding and Dry Dock Co., Newport News, Virginia, and was launched on 2 December 1967. She was commissioned on 14 December 1968, and was re-designated as LKA-113 on 1 January 1969.

Charleston was involved in the Vietnam War, and earned eight awards and campaign ribbons for her service.

Decommissioned 1992, she was mothballed at Portsmouth, Virginia. She was berthed at the Naval Inactive Ship Maintenance Facility in Philadelphia, Pennsylvania, and is currently being towed to a scrapping yard in Texas.

There is no DANFS entry for the ship.

== In popular culture ==
In the Tom Clancy novel Red Storm Rising, The Charleston is sunk by an AS-4 missile launched by a Badger bomber while part of an amphibious group involved in the recovery of Iceland from a Soviet invasion.

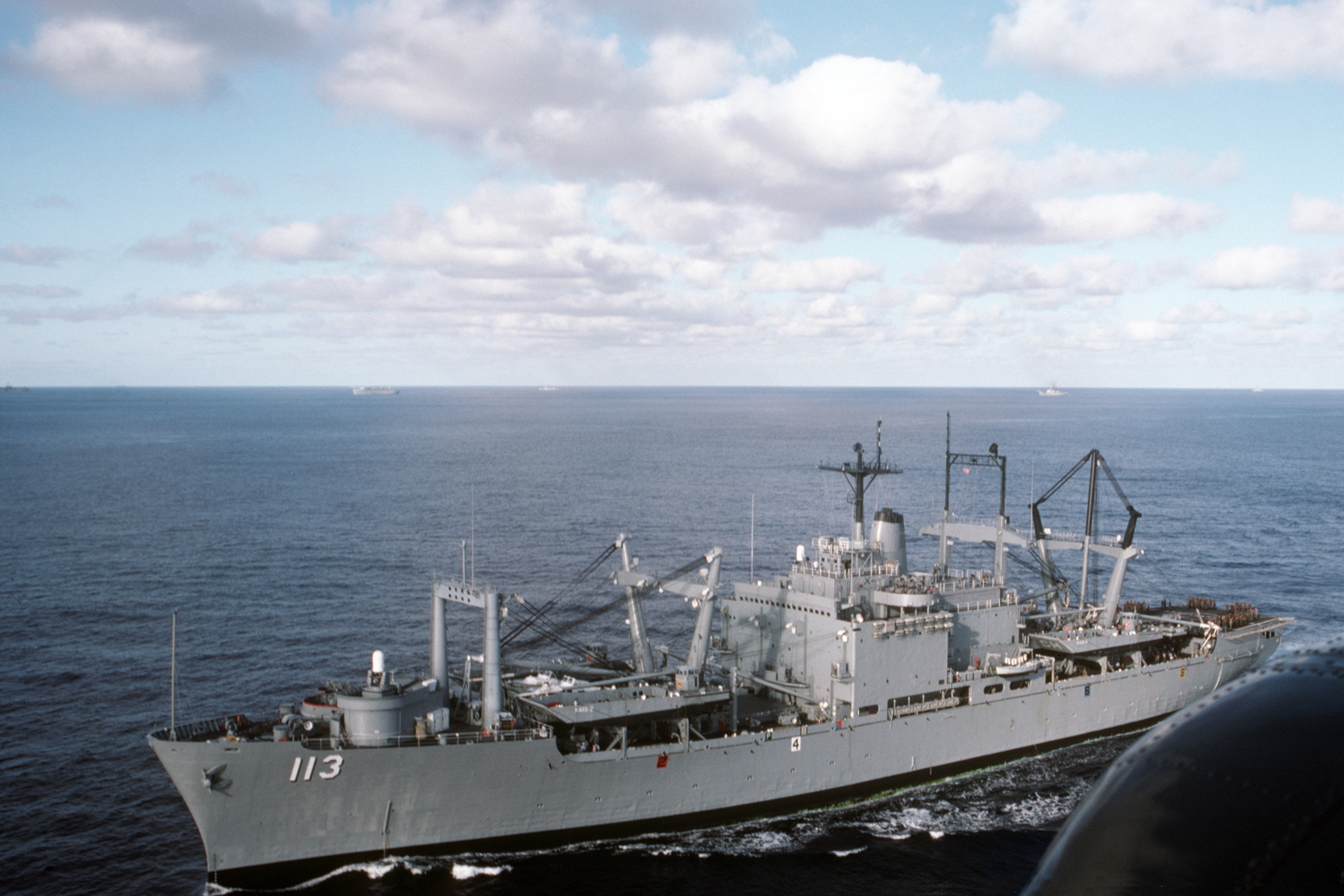
