= USS Zenobia =

Cargo ship of the United States Navy

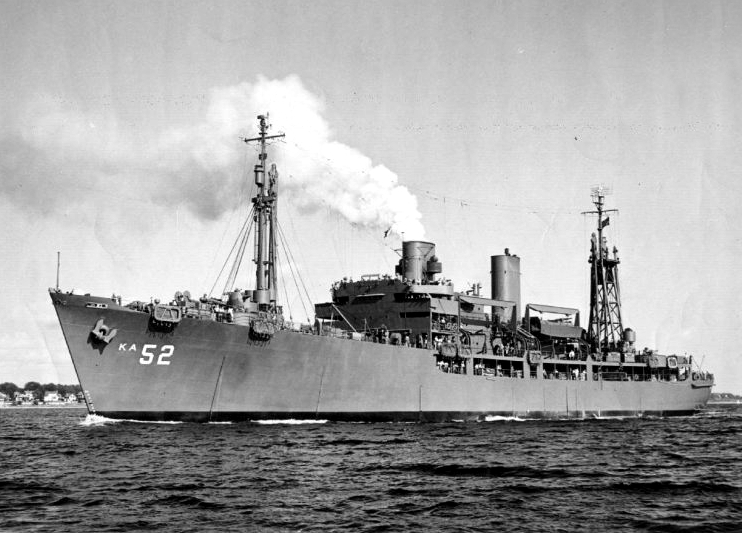

History

United States
- Name: USS Zenobia
- Namesake: The asteroid Zenobia
- Builder: Walsh-Kaiser Company, Providence, Rhode Island
- Laid down: 12 May 1945
- Launched: 6 July 1945
- Commissioned: 6 August 1945
- Decommissioned: 7 May 1946
- Stricken: 30 November 1946
- Fate: Sold to Chile, 9 December 1946

Chile
- Name: Presidente Pinto
- Acquired: 9 December 1946
- Decommissioned: 1962
- Fate: Believed scrapped about 1974

General characteristics
- Class & type: Artemis-class attack cargo ship
- Type: S4–SE2–BE1
- Displacement: 4,087 long tons (4,153 t) light; 7,080 long tons (7,194 t) full
- Length: 426 ft (130 m)
- Beam: 58 ft (18 m)
- Draft: 16 ft (4.9 m)
- Speed: 16.9 knots (31.3 km/h; 19.4 mph)
- Complement: 303 officers and enlisted
- Armament: 1 × 5"/38 caliber gun mount; 4 × twin 40 mm gun mounts; 10 × 20 mm gun mounts

USS Zenobia (AKA-52) was an Artemis-class attack cargo ship in service with the United States Navy from 1945 to 1946. She was then sold to Chile, where she served as Presidente Pinto (AKA-41) until 1966. She was scrapped in 1974.

== History ==
Zenobia (AKA-62) was named after 840 Zenobia which is a minor planet orbiting the Sun. Zenobia was also the name of a queen of the Palmyrene Empire who reigned from 267 to 272 A.D. The ship was laid down under a Maritime Commission contract (MC hull 1913) on 12 May 1945 at Providence, R.I., by the Walsh-Kaiser Co., Inc.; launched on 6 July 1945; sponsored by Mrs. Lillian V. MacDonald; and commissioned at the Boston Navy Yard on 6 August 1945.

=== U.S. Navy ===
Following her shakedown, Zenobia relieved Vermilion as a training ship with the Atlantic Fleet's Operational Training Command on 19 August. She served briefly in that role before she was reassigned to Service Force, Atlantic Fleet (ServLant), on 11 September. She operated with ServLant in 1946.

Although allocated to the Amphibious Force of the Atlantic Fleet on 1 April 1946, Zenobia's days as a United States naval vessel were numbered. She reported to the Commandant, 3rd Naval District, on 7 April and was decommissioned exactly one month later, on 7 May, at Brooklyn, N.Y. Struck from the Navy list on 30 November 1946, Zenobia was transferred at Brooklyn to the government of the Republic of Chile on 9 December 1946. More precisely, the ship was sold to Chile.

=== Chilean Navy ===
Renamed Presidente Pinto, the former Navy attack cargo ship served the Chilean Navy as a transport through the late 1960s, including being the yearly supply ship for Easter Island and figuring prominently in scientific expeditions there, and ended her active career as a training ship for midshipmen. She was transferred to "harbor duties" in 1968 — probably serving as a floating barracks or accommodation ship — and was replaced as training ship by the four-masted schooner Esmeralda. Presidente Pinto was probably scrapped in about 1974.
