= Chilean ship Presidente Pinto =

Chilean ship Presidente Pinto may refer to:

- Chilean cruiser Presidente Pinto (1890)
- USS Zenobia (AKA-52) or Presidente Pinto
