= Disembarkation =

Process of unloading a watercraft or an aircraft

Disembarkation or debarcation/debarkation is the process of leaving a ship or aircraft, or removing goods from a ship or aircraft. (debark: from the French des meaning "from", and, barque, meaning "small ship").

== Civilian ==
The loading and unloading of cargo has traditionally been handled by stevedores, also known as longshoremen, wharfies, etc. Today, the vast majority of non-bulk cargo is transported in intermodal containers, which are loaded and unloaded using specialized cranes.

People normally board and depart a ship via a gangplank (gangway), a movable structure usually consisting of a ramp with stairs and railings. The gangplank may lead to either a dock or a small boat (or lighter) that connects to the shore. Accidents during disembarkation are most often due to being struck by a rope (line), railing or other items due to the ship's motion, or attempting to avoid such items. The second most common cause is slipping or tripping on the gangway.

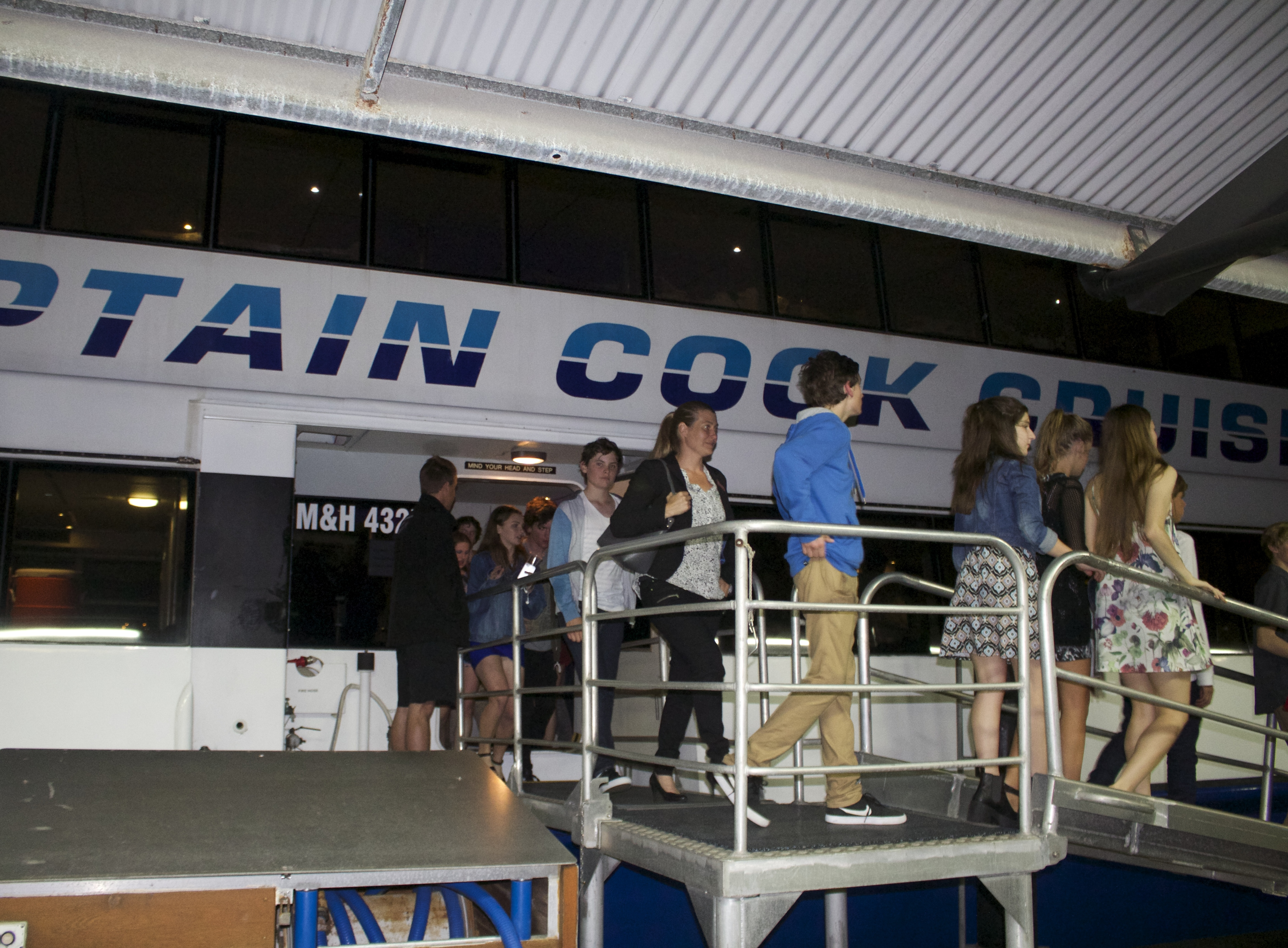
Passengers disembarking from a ship via a gangway

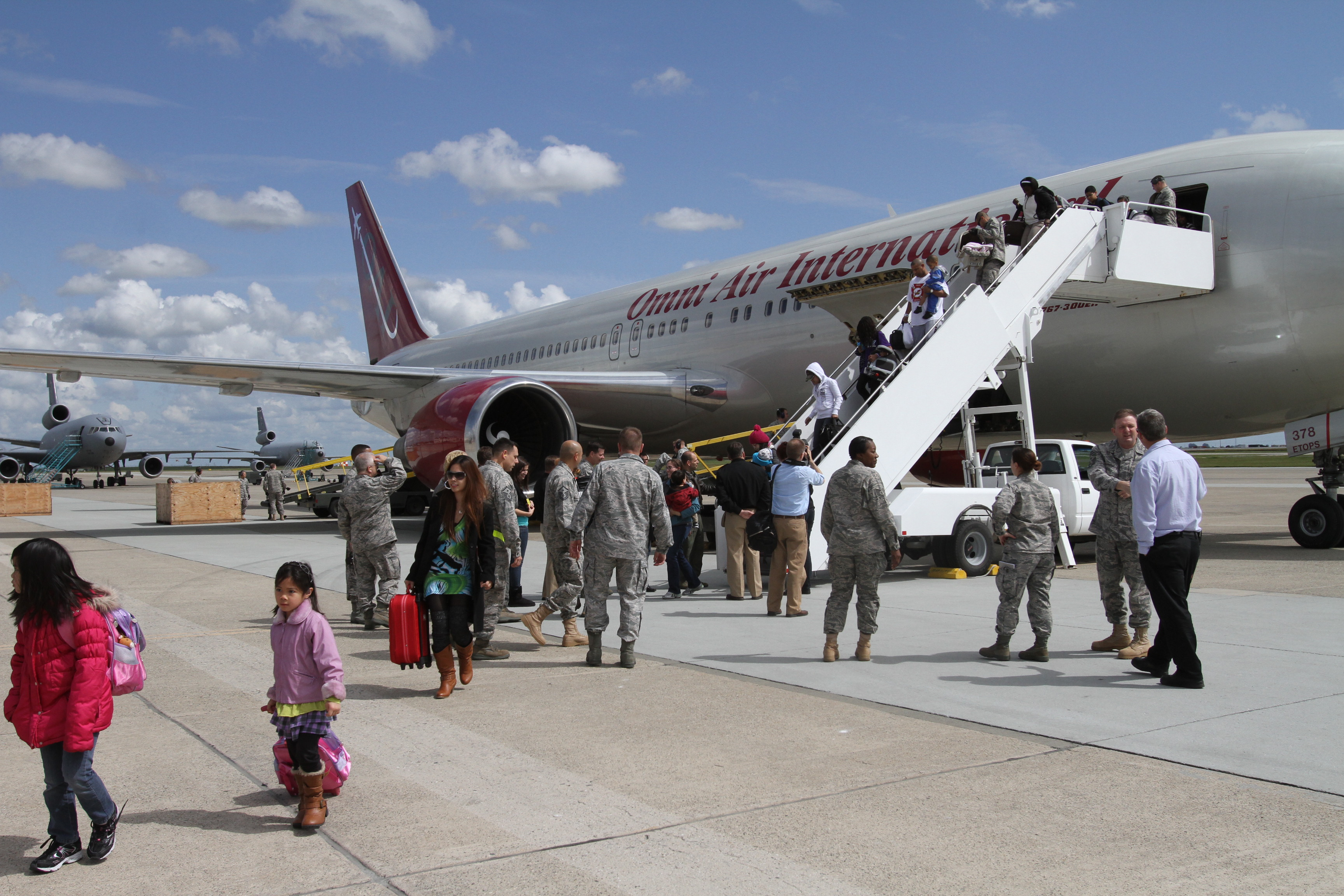
Passengers disembarking from a plane

== Military ==
Military debarking procedures, even in non-combat zones, can be quite complex. In addition to routine operations, debarking can be conducted under fire as part of amphibious assaults, such as that of the Normandy landings during World War II. In such cases, it is vital that cargo be loaded so it can be unloaded in the order needed, rather than simply to maximize the use of space. This is called combat loading. Landing craft are used to transport both troops and cargo to the shore.

== See also ==
- Glossary of nautical terms (A-L)
- Glossary of nautical terms (M-Z)
- Embarkment
- Boarding (transport)
