= USS Durham =

United States Navy amphibious cargo ship

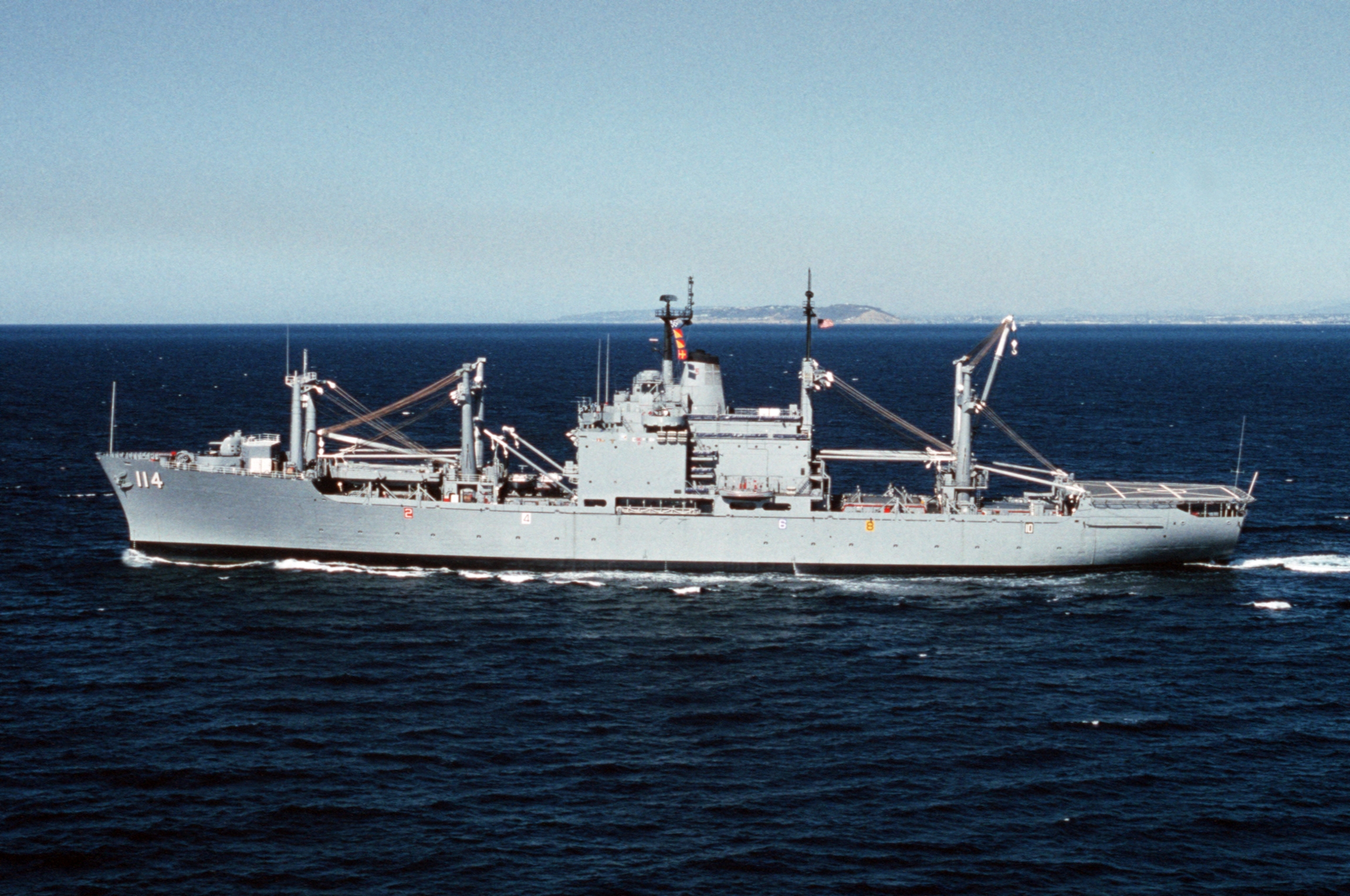
- USS Durham off San Diego in 1989

History

United States
- Name: Durham
- Namesake: Durham
- Builder: Newport News Shipbuilding and Dry Dock Co.
- Laid down: 10 July 1967
- Launched: 29 March 1968
- Commissioned: 24 May 1969
- Decommissioned: 25 February 1994
- Stricken: 31 August 2015
- Identification: Pennant number: LKA-114
- Fate: Sunk as target, 30 August 2020
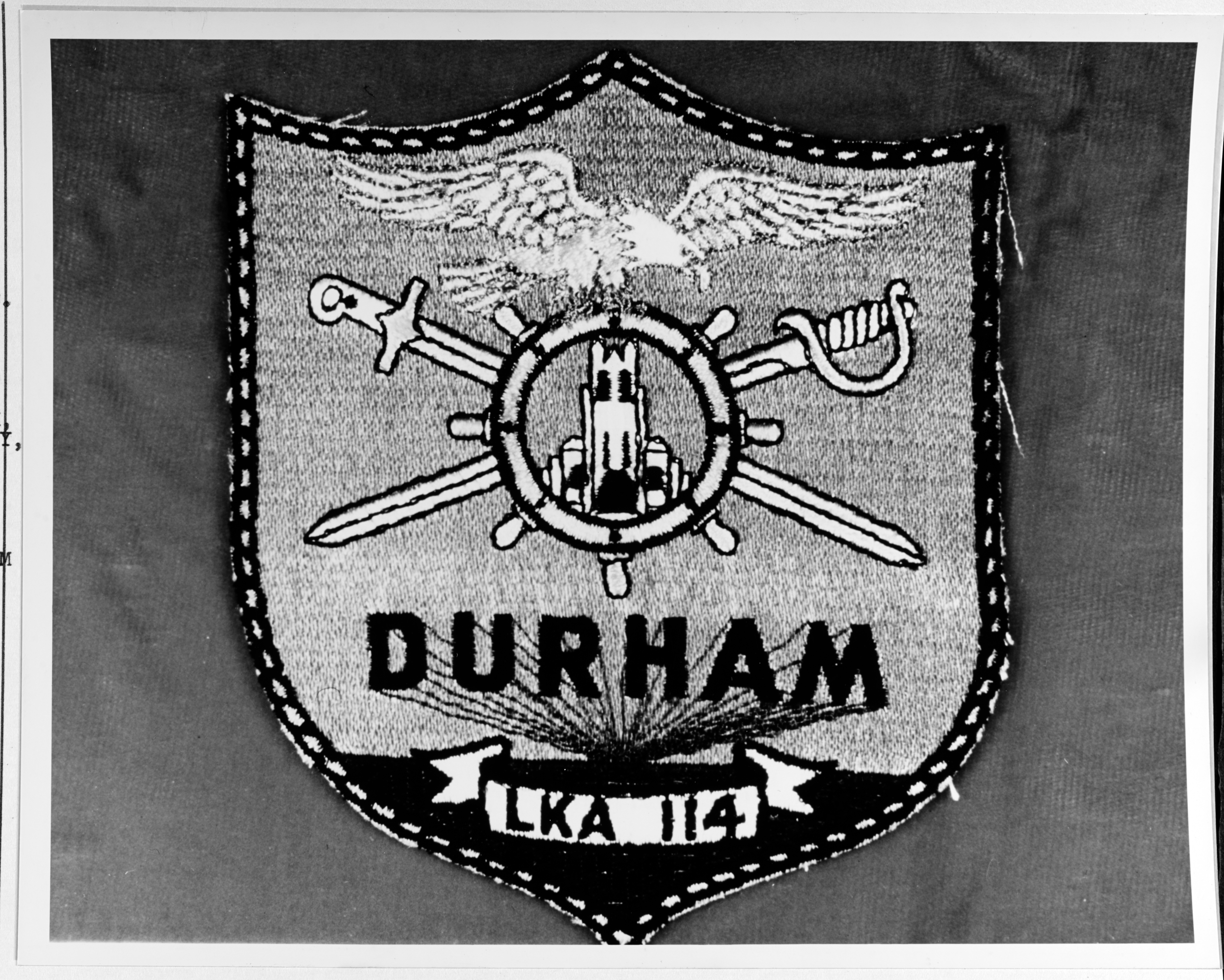
- Badge

General characteristics
- Class & type: Charleston-class amphibious cargo ship
- Displacement: 9,937 tons (light); 18,322 tons (full load)
- Length: 575 ft 6 in (175.41 m)
- Beam: 82 ft (25 m)
- Draft: 25 ft 5 in (7.75 m)
- Boats & landing craft carried: 18 × LCM-8 and LCM-6 landing craft
- Complement: 50 officers, 592 men
- Armament: 4 × twin 3"/50 caliber guns

Service record
- Operations: Vietnam War; Gulf War

USS Durham (LKA-114) was a Charleston-class amphibious cargo ship in service with the United States Navy from 1969 to 1994. She was sunk as a target in August 2020.

== History ==
USS Durham was named after Durham, North Carolina. She served as a commissioned ship for 24 years and 9 months, and earned a total of 15 awards and campaign ribbons for her service. She was laid down as AKA-114 at Newport News Shipbuilding and Dry Dock Co., Newport News, VA, and redesignated LKA-114 on 1 January 1969. She was commissioned on 24 May 1969.

In April 1975, Durham participated in Operation Frequent Wind, the evacuation of Saigon at the end of the Vietnam War.

In the Gulf War, she was part of an 18-ship amphibious task force that was the largest such force since the Korean War. The task force arrived on station in the North Arabian Sea on 12 January 1991.

The ship was decommissioned on 25 February 1994. She was sunk by HMAS Stuart and her embarked MH-60R Seahawk on 30 August 2020 as part of a live fire exercise during Exercise RIMPAC 2020.

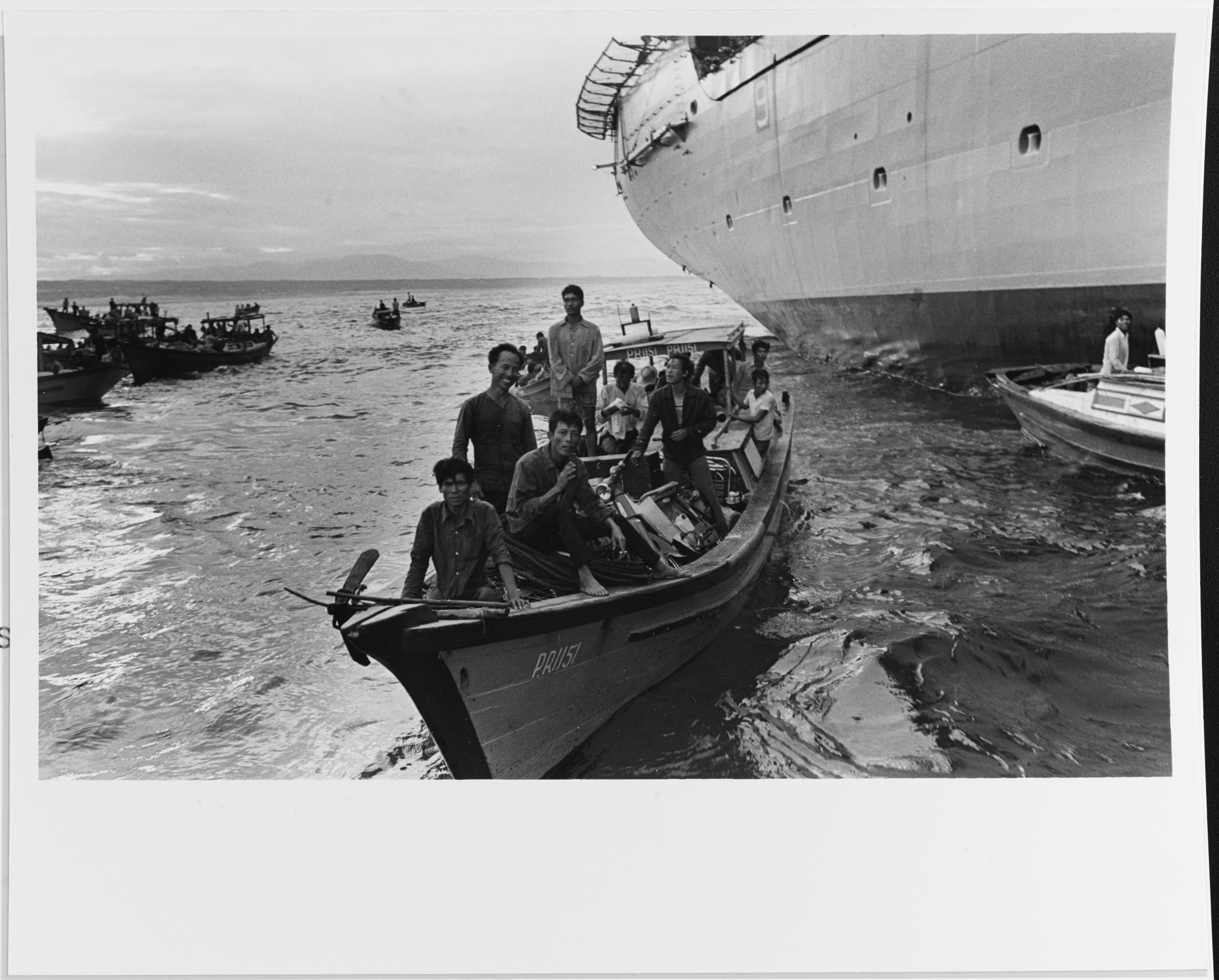
Durham evacuates refugees from Phan Rang.

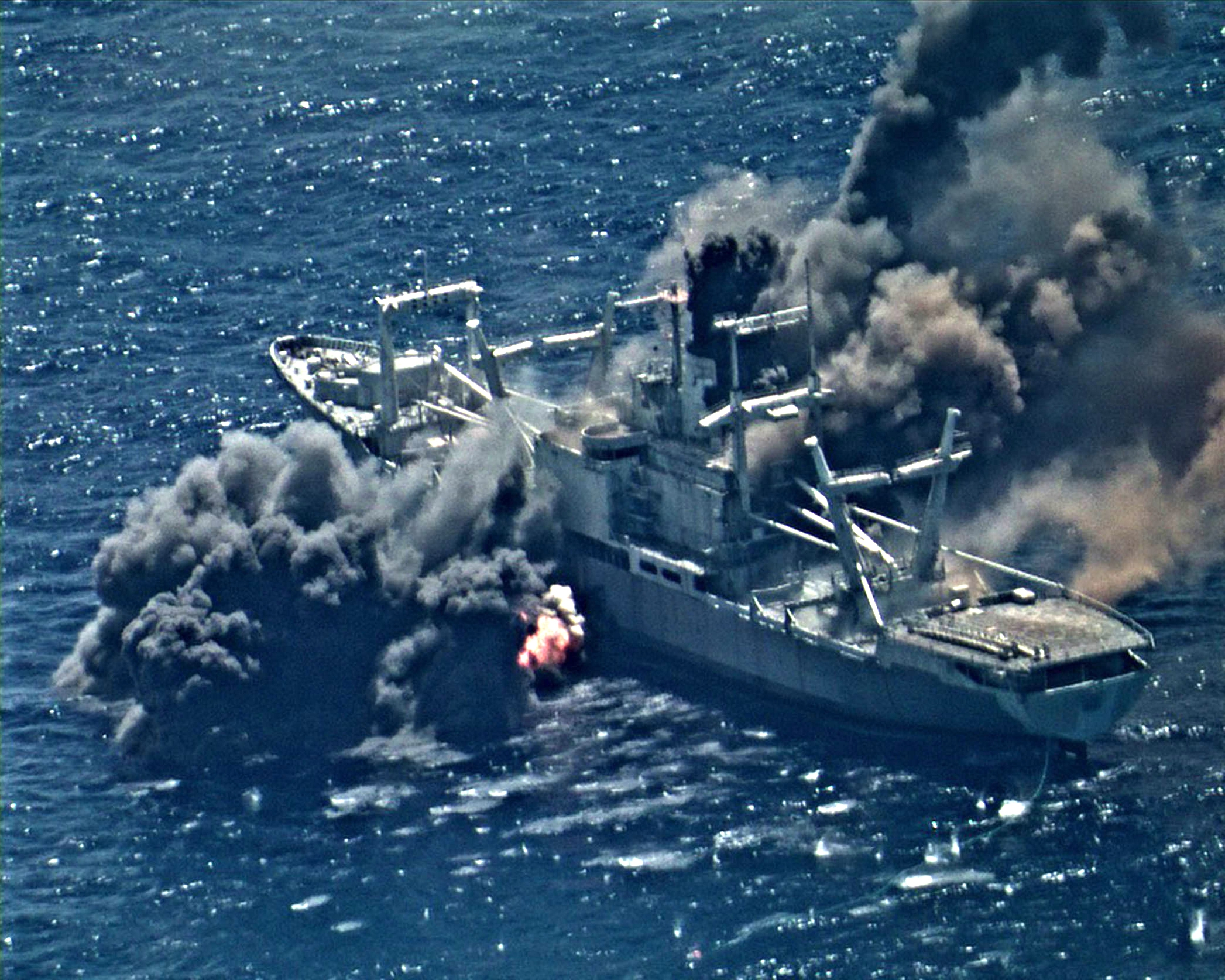
Durham being sunk, 30 August 2020.

== See also ==
- List of ships sunk by missiles
