= Type S4 ship =

Type S4 ship may refer to:

- Casablanca-class escort carrier a S4-S2-BB3 ship.
- Gilliam-class attack transport a S4-SE2-BD1 ship.
- Artemis-class attack cargo ship a S4-SE2-BE1 ship.
