= USS Tuscaloosa (LST-1187) =

Newport-class tank landing ship

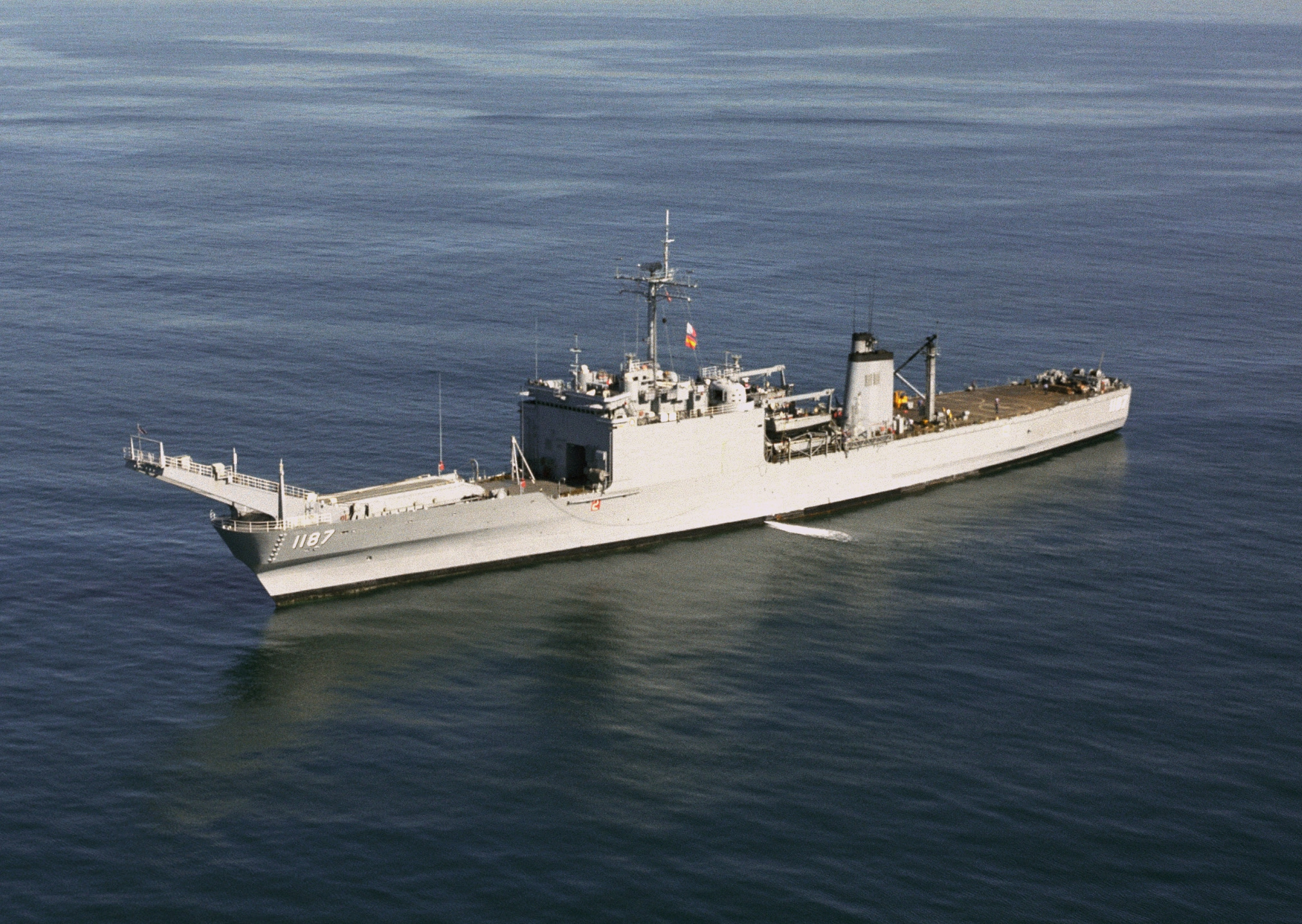
- USS Tuscaloosa (LST-1187) at anchor off San Diego in 1976

History

United States
- Name: Tuscaloosa
- Namesake: Tuscaloosa
- Builder: National Steel and Shipbuilding Company, San Diego, California
- Laid down: 23 November 1968
- Launched: 6 September 1969
- Commissioned: 24 October 1970
- Decommissioned: 18 February 1994
- Fate: Sunk as target, 14 July 2014

General characteristics as built
- Class & type: Newport-class tank landing ship
- Displacement: 4,793 long tons (4,870 t) light; 8,342 long tons (8,476 t) full load
- Length: 522 ft 4 in (159.2 m) oa; 562 ft (171.3 m) over derrick arms
- Beam: 69 ft 6 in (21.2 m)
- Draft: 17 ft 6 in (5.3 m) max
- Propulsion: 2 shafts; 6 Alco diesel engines (3 per shaft); 16,500 shp (12,300 kW); Bow thruster
- Speed: 22 knots (41 km/h; 25 mph) max
- Range: 2,500 nmi (4,600 km; 2,900 mi) at 14 knots (26 km/h; 16 mph)
- Troops: 431 max
- Complement: 213
- Sensors & processing systems: 2 × Mk 63 GCFS; SPS-10 radar
- Armament: 2 × twin 3"/50 caliber guns
- Aviation facilities: Helicopter deck

USS Tuscaloosa (LST-1187) was the ninth of the Newport-class tank landing ships of the United States Navy, which replaced the traditional bow door-design tank landing ships (LSTs). The vessel was constructed by the National Steel and Shipbuilding Company in San Diego, California and was launched in 1969 and commissioned in 1970 and the second ship of the United States Navy to be named after the city of Tuscaloosa, Alabama. The LST participated in the Vietnam War and was decommissioned in 1994. The ship was laid up until being sunk as a target ship during a sinking exercise in 2014.

== Design and description ==
Tuscaloosa was a Newport-class tank landing ship which were designed to meet the goal put forward by the United States amphibious forces to have a tank landing ship (LST) capable of over 20 knots (37 km/h; 23 mph). However, the traditional bow door form for LSTs would not be capable. Therefore, the designers of the Newport class came up with a design of a traditional ship hull with a 112-foot (34 m) aluminum ramp slung over the bow supported by two derrick arms. The 34-long-ton (35 t) ramp was capable of sustaining loads up to 75 long tons (76 t). This made the Newport class the first to depart from the standard LST design that had been developed in early World War II.

The LST had a displacement of 4,793 long tons (4,870 t) when light and 8,342 long tons (8,476 t) at full load. Tuscaloosa was 522 feet 4 inches (159.2 m) long overall and 562 ft (171.3 m) over the derrick arms which protruded past the bow. The vessel had a beam of 69 ft 6 in (21.2 m), a draft forward of 11 ft 5 in (3.5 m) and 17 ft 5 in (5.3 m) at the stern at full load.

Tuscaloosa was fitted with six Alco 16-645-ES diesel engines turning two shafts, three to each shaft. The system was rated at 16,500 brake horsepower (12,300 kW) and gave the ship a maximum speed of 22 knots (41 km/h; 25 mph) for short periods and could only sustain 20 knots (37 km/h; 23 mph) for an extended length of time. The LST carried 1,750 long tons (1,780 t) of diesel fuel for a range of 2,500 nautical miles (4,600 km; 2,900 mi) at the cruising speed of 14 knots (26 km/h; 16 mph). The ship was also equipped with a bow thruster to allow for better maneuvering near causeways and to hold position while offshore during the unloading of amphibious vehicles.

The Newport class were larger and faster than previous LSTs and were able to transport tanks, heavy vehicles and engineer groups and supplies that were too large for helicopters or smaller landing craft to carry. The LSTs have a ramp forward of the superstructure that connects the lower tank deck with the main deck and a passage large enough to allow access to the parking area amidships. The vessels are also equipped with a stern gate to allow the unloading of amphibious vehicles directly into the water or to unload onto a utility landing craft (LCU) or pier. At either end of the tank deck there is a 30 ft (9.1 m) turntable that permits vehicles to turn around without having to reverse. The Newport class has the capacity for 500 long tons (510 t) of vehicles, 19,000 ft^{2} (1,800 m^{2}) of cargo area and could carry up to 431 troops. The vessels also have davits for four vehicle and personnel landing craft (LCVPs) and could carry four pontoon causeway sections along the sides of the hull.

Tuscaloosa was initially armed with four Mark 33 3-inch (76 mm)/50 caliber guns in two twin turrets. The vessel was equipped with two Mk 63 gun control fire systems (GCFS) for the 3-inch guns, but these were removed in 1977–1978. The ship also had SPS-10 surface search radar. Atop the stern gate, the vessels mounted a helicopter deck. They had a maximum complement of 213 including 11 officers.

== Construction and career ==
The LST was ordered as the last of the second group in Fiscal Year 1966 on 15 July 1966. The ship was laid down on 23 November 1968 by the National Steel and Shipbuilding Company at their yard in San Diego, California. Named for a city in Alabama, Tuscaloosa was launched on 6 September 1969, sponsored by the wife of Vice-Admiral Thomas F. Connolly. The LST was commissioned on 24 October 1970.

=== 1970s ===
Tuscaloosa was assigned to the United States Pacific Fleet and spent the remainder of the year performing routine missions along the West Coast of the United States. On 18 May 1971, the LST departed San Diego for a deployment to the Western Pacific (WestPac) loaded with sections of Quonset huts and landing vehicle tracked (LVTs). Tuscaloosa arrived at Okinawa, Japan on 1 June and after unloading, sailed for Da Nang, South Vietnam via Subic Bay, Philippines. From Da Nang the vessel returned to San Diego with a load of United States Marine Corps equipment and returned to routine operations. On 1 October Tuscaloosa sailed again for a seven-month WestPac deployment in company with Amphibious Squadron 5 (PHIBRON 5). (Note: PHIBRON 5 was composed of USS Tripoli, USS Duluth, USS Anchorage, USS Mobile and USS Schenectady.) For the remainder of the year, the landing ship conducted exercises and operations in the Philippines and off Okinawa. Tuscaloosa operated with marines, took part in amphibious exercises and ended the year at Sasebo, Japan.

Tuscaloosa got underway for the Ryukyus on 4 January 1972 but was delayed by a collision with a Japanese patrol craft. The LST was undamaged and sailed the next day for Okinawa where the landing ship embarked marines and transported them to Yokosuka, Japan. Following repairs to her bow doors, the ship sailed for the Philippines and arrived at Subic Bay on 16 February. There she loaded a cargo of generators and delivered them to Vũng Tàu, South Vietnam. Tuscaloosa returned to Japan transporting marines and equipment, before she headed back to the Philippines for amphibious exercises. Then, upon completion of these exercises, Tuscaloosa sailed in company with USS Mobile and USS Denver to Vietnamese waters, arriving on Yankee Station in the Tonkin Gulf on 6 April. The LST remained on station until 3 May sailing for Subic Bay. Tuscaloosa subsequently returned to Vietnam and operated both at Da Nang and on Yankee Station until late May. Following those deployments, the LST was sent to support Thailand contingency operations by transporting Marine Corps equipment and Navy construction battalion tools. Tuscaloosa ended its 10-month deployment, returning to the United States.

Tuscaloosa engaged in routine operations off the California coast into mid-1973. On 29 August, the ship deployed to WestPac with Project Handclasp material for delivery to communities in the Philippines. Tuscaloosa later participated in Operation Pagasa II in conjunction with units of the Philippine Navy and operated out of Subic Bay for the remainder of the year with port calls at Hong Kong and Kaohsiung, Taiwan.

1974 began with naval exercises with South Korean naval units in Operation Fly Away and departed for the United States on 11 February 1974 via Pearl Harbor, Hawaii. Tuscaloosa's underwent a major overhaul by the Todd Pacific Shipyards at Seattle, Washington beginning on 9 July. On 3 August an 11-man rescue and assistance party from the ship assisted USS Moctobi in saving USS Lipan from sinking after the naval ship collided with another vessel in the Strait of Juan de Fuca. Once Tuscaloosa's own repairs and overhaul were completed, the LST rejoined the fleet on 12 December resumed routine operations into 1975. The ship deployed to WestPac on 1 April accompanied from San Diego by Korean mine craft and USS Barbour County.

At this time the situation in Southeast Asia deteriorated rapidly for the United States. Both the US-backed South Vietnamese and Cambodian governments were tottering and their forces retreating. Tuscaloosa arrived at Pearl Harbor on 6 April and proceeded on toward the Ryukyus on the same day. Arriving at Okinawa on 18 April, the LST's crew offloaded cargo and pressed on the next day for Subic Bay at full speed. Tuscaloosa arrived at Subic Bay on 21 April and embarked 280 sailors who had been unable to return to the aircraft carriers USS Enterprise, USS Midway and USS Hancock when the ships were hurriedly sent to participate in Operation Frequent Wind, the evacuation of Saigon.

Tuscaloosa was then assigned to Operation New Life, escorting 26 former Republic of Vietnam Navy ships to the Philippines. During the passage, the LST's efforts in resupply earned Tuscaloosa a Meritorious Unit Commendation. In addition, parties from the ship were sent to salvage and repair various Vietnamese ships. Two Vietnamese craft were evacuated and sunk by gunfire from Tuscaloosa to eliminate possible hazards to navigation. In addition, four Vietnamese craft were temporarily taken over by the United States Navy and placed under the command of four officers from Tuscaloosa. The LST earned four battle stars for service during the Vietnam War.

From Subic Bay, Tuscaloosa proceeded to Okinawa and, upon arrival there, was ordered to make best possible speed for the Gulf of Thailand to take part in the evacuation in that area. However, four days later, the ship was ordered to turn around as the evacuation had been completed. Thereafter the LST continued routine operations before returning to the west coast of the United States on 17 November 1975. The ship conducted another deployment to Westpac during the period 29 March to 17 November 1977 and underwent an overhaul from 3 February to 10 December 1978 at San Diego. The vessel then returned to routine operations off the US West Coast in 1979.

=== Later service ===
In December 1989, Tuscaloosa sailed with Marines from Alpha Company 1st Battalion, 3rd Marines to the Philippines, in response to the Coup attempt in the Philippines.

== Decommissioning and fate ==
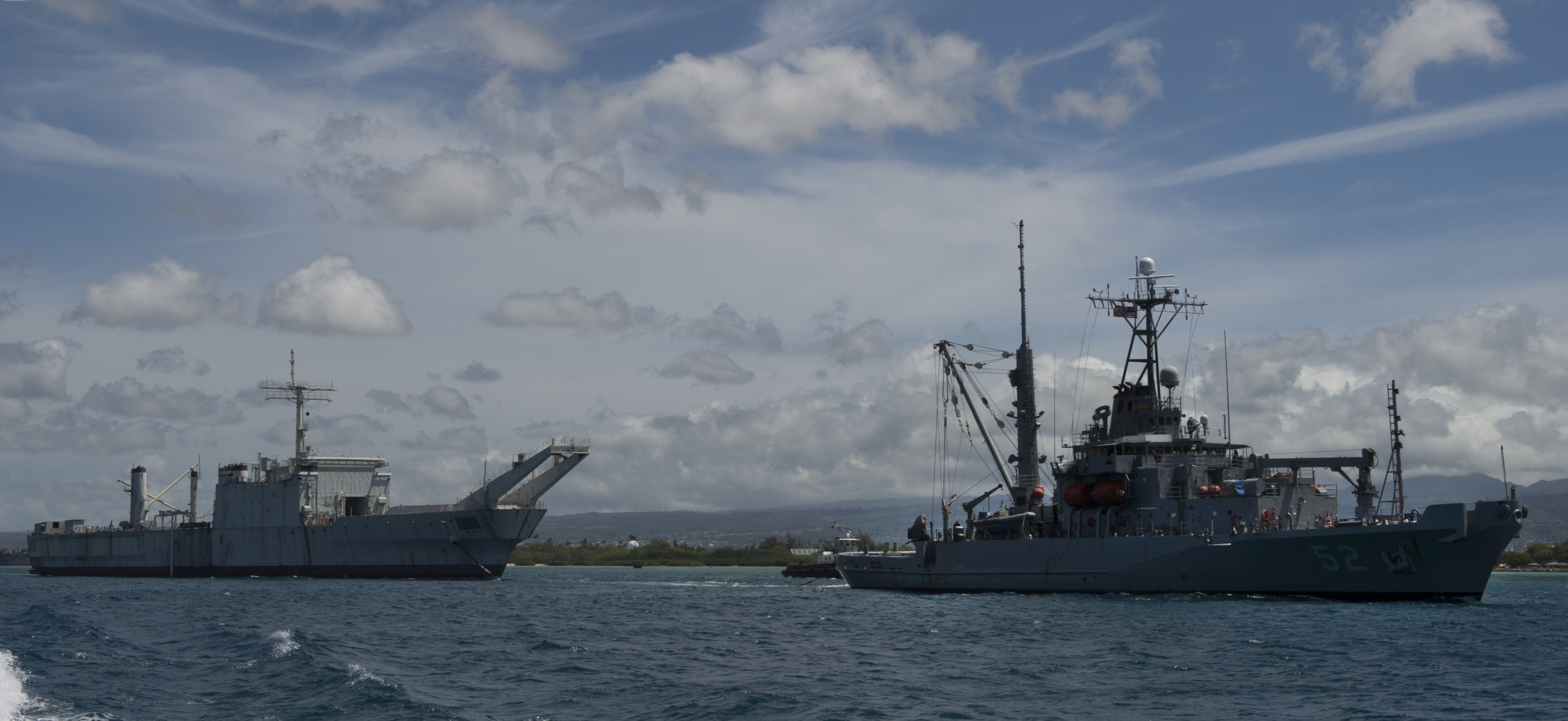
USNS Salvor tows Tuscaloosa from Pearl Harbor to be sunk, 12 July 2014

Tuscaloosa was decommissioned on 18 February 1994. The ship was laid up and eventually struck from the Naval Vessel Register on 1 December 2008. Tuscaloosa was towed out to the Pacific past Hawaii and sunk as a target ship alongside Ogden during a sinking exercise during RIMPAC 2014 on 23 July 2014.
