= USS St. Louis (LKA-116) =

American amphibious cargo ship

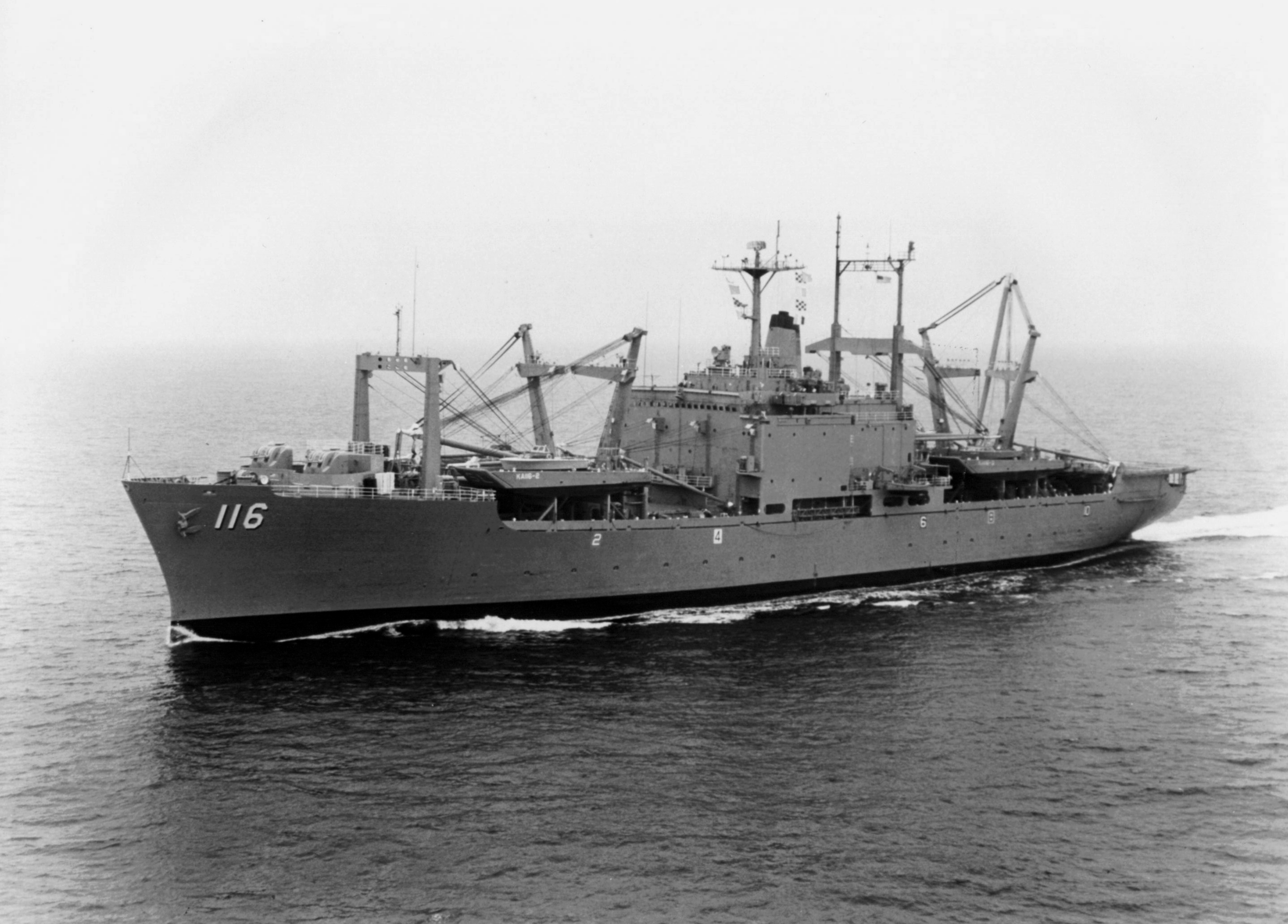
- USS St. Louis (LKA-116) in 1976

History

United States
- Name: USS St. Louis
- Namesake: St. Louis, Missouri
- Ordered: 11 June 1965
- Builder: Newport News Shipbuilding and Dry Dock Co.
- Laid down: 3 April 1968
- Launched: 4 January 1969
- Commissioned: 22 November 1969
- Decommissioned: 2 November 1992
- Stricken: 31 August 2015
- Fate: Sunk as a target 21 September 2018

General characteristics
- Class & type: Charleston-class amphibious cargo ship
- Displacement: 18,465 tons (full load)
- Length: 576 ft (176 m)
- Beam: 82 ft (25 m)
- Draft: 26 ft (7.9 m)
- Propulsion: Steam Turbine
- Speed: 20 knots (37 km/h)
- Complement: 50 officers, 592 men

Service record
- Operations: Vietnam War

USS St. Louis (AKA-116/LKA-116), a Charleston class amphibious cargo ship, was the sixth US ship to bear the name. She served as a commissioned ship for 22 years and 11 months.

She was laid down as AKA-116 on 3 April 1968 by the Newport News Shipbuilding and Dry Dock Co., Newport News, Virginia; redesignated LKA-116 on 1 January 1969; and launched on 4 January 1969. She was sponsored by Leonor K. Sullivan, Representative from the 3d District of Missouri and commissioned on 22 November 1969 at the Norfolk Naval Shipyard, Captain John W. Klinefelter in command. USS St. Louis (LKA-116) was decommissioned on 2 November 1992 in Sasebo, Japan. From Sasebo the ship was towed to Pearl Harbor, HI, where she was kept in mothballs.

== Initial trials and training ==
Following commissioning, St. Louis was outfitted at Norfolk; and, on 3 February 1970, commenced trials. On 6 February, she was ready for sea and sailed for Long Beach, California, her home port. While en route, she conducted underway training for her crew, visited Fort Lauderdale, Florida, transited the Panama Canal and arrived at Long Beach on 28 February ready for two months of intensive training in battle organization and amphibious operations.

St. Louis spent May and June in post-shakedown availability and the greater part of July in provisioning preparatory to her first deployment with the fleet. Late in July, she conducted her first dependents' cruise to familiarize the families of her crew members with her operations and capabilities. She got underway on 1 August with units of Amphibious Squadron 11 for Pearl Harbor.

== Vietnam ==
St. Louis, with the squadron, reached Pearl Harbor on 6 August, refueled, and sailed on the 8th for South Vietnam. On 16 August, she was detached to proceed to Subic Bay and finally rejoined her squadron at Da Nang on 21 August. After offloading Marines and their equipment, she then proceeded to Buckner Bay, Okinawa, returned to Long Beach to transport a World War II midget Japanese submarine to the submarine base at Pearl Harbor; and moored to deep water pier in Da Nang Harbor on 11 October. After completion of a large redeployment operation involving over 2,000 Marines and 22,000 tons of equipment in Quảng Nam Province, St. Louis visited Hong Kong and then moved to Subic Bay in the Philippines to participate in large scale amphibious landing exercises during November and December.

St. Louis completed the amphibious exercise in early January, spent 15 days in upkeep in Subic Bay, then headed north again for two months of shuttling men and cargo between Vietnam, Okinawa, and Japan. She departed from Yokosuka on 20 March 1971 and entered Long Beach on the 31st. After a month and a half stand down period in Long Beach and three more weeks of local operations and upkeep there, she returned to Vietnam, arriving in Da Nang on 24 June. She visited Hong Kong, 28 June to 3 July, then returned to Long Beach on 19 July. St. Louis remained on the west coast for the remainder of 1971 and for the first three months of 1972. During this period, she was engaged in refresher training, amphibious exercises, and upkeep.

== 1970s-1980s ==
On 31 March 1972 St. Louis headed out of Long Beach Naval Shipyard back to the picket line off the coast of South Vietnam, participating in the defense of Quảng Trị Province during the Easter Offensive on 24 May 1972. The St. Louis offloaded South Vietnamese Marines and US Navy SEAL squads during this assault, earning a campaign star, and later, in the 1990s, the Combat Action Ribbon. After seven months of transporting men and cargo between various bases in the western Pacific, she returned to Long Beach on Veterans Day 1972. She spent the rest of 1972 and all of 1973 on the west coast. She visited Acapulco, Mexico, in February, participated in DSRV operations in May and visited Portland, Oregon, in June for the annual Rose Festival. She finished out 1973 with availability periods, refresher training, and amphibious exercises. In mid-January 1974, St. Louis stood out of Long Beach to return to the western Pacific. As of May 1974, she was in port at Subic Bay, Philippines. In 1980–1981 she sailed a WESTPAC Cruise leaving San Diego, to pick up Marines from MSSG-31. She sailed to several countries Philippines, Thailand, Singapore, Africa, Freemantle, Australia, Okinawa, South Korea. She had a beautiful stop at Diego Garcia & was in the Persian Gulf when the hostages of the American Embassy in Tehran were released in 1981. A Battle "E" was awarded to the ship: the Navy Expeditionary Medal was awarded to Sailors, and the Marine Corps Expeditionary Medal was awarded to Marines. Captain D.R. "The Snake" Morris, (later RADM) was the Commanding Officer of the ship, and Major Bailey was the Commanding Officer of the embarked Marines.

The St. Louis returned to her home port of 32nd Street Naval Station San Diego, California. In 1983 she changed home port to Sasebo, Japan where she performed troop transfers between Okinawa and Korea and amphibious ready group deployments until she was decommissioned in 1992.

== Early 1990s and fate ==
St. Louis would spend most of 1990 in repair and upkeep period. In May 1991, the St. Louis would participate in Operation Sea Angel in Chittagong Bangladesh after a powerful tropical cyclone struck the Chittagong district of southeastern Bangladesh killing at least 138,000 people and leaving as many as 10 million homeless. On 13 May 1991, Seventh Fleet ordered the USS St. Louis under the command of Capt. John W. Peterson, to proceed from Subic Bay in the Philippines to Naha, Okinawa Japan. On board were the personnel and equipment of Charlie Company, 9th Engineer Support Battalion, and Marines from ELMACO 3rd FSSG whose 4-month deployment was ended earlier than scheduled due to the ship's new orders. At Naha, the St. Louis would load 28 reverse osmosis water purification units ( ROWPUs) each weighing more than 5 tons for use in the relief effort. The amphibious cargo ship St. Louis departed Okinawa on 19 May and arrived 10 days later on 29 May, off the coast of Chittagong, Bangladesh.

After this, the St. Louis was released from their duties of a successful operation. Early on the 8th the St. Louis weighed anchor and steamed for Phuket, Thailand, where her crew was granted their first liberty in weeks. The St. Louis arrived in Phuket, Thailand on 11 June and would depart on 15 June. As the St. Louis left Phuket her tasking again was changed. On orders from the Seventh Fleet, the St. Louis was to make the best possible speed to Subic Bay in the Philippines. There the St. Louis would provide humanitarian assistance to the naval base and nearby Cubi Point Naval Air Station during Operation Fiery Vigil after the volcanic eruption of Mount Pinatubo, followed by several days of torrential rains and severe earthquakes.

St. Louis was involved in exercises off Pohang, Korea and Okinawa, Japan in 1991 and 1992. In May 1992, the St. Louis would make her final voyage to liberty ports Penang, Malaysia, Singapore, the St. Louis crossed the equator on 19 May 1992 at latitude 00.00 and longitude 106.01 East after departing Singapore. The St. Louis would make its way to Pattaya, Thailand and finally Hong Kong before departing one last time for Sasebo, Japan where the St. Louis was stationed. St. Louis was decommissioned and put in reserve on 2 November 1992. As of 30 July 2001 she was berthed at the Naval Inactive Ship Maintenance Facility, Middle Loch, in Pearl Harbor. St. Louis was finally sunk as a target for Valiant Shield 2018 on 21 September 2018.

== Awards ==

- St. Louis earned two battle stars for service in the Vietnam War.
- St. Louis earned two Battle E Awards during pacific theatre operations in 1981 and 1982.
