= Artemis-class attack cargo ship =

US Navy class during World War II

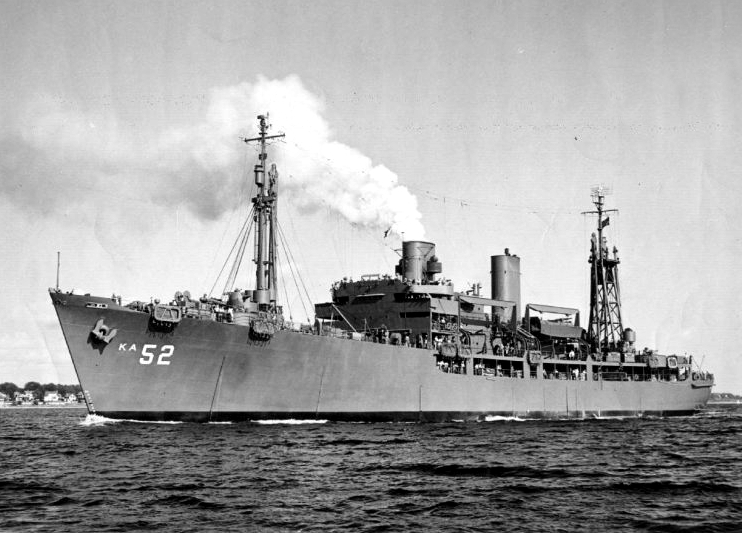
- USS Zenobia – a typical Artemis-class AKA

Class overview
- Builders: Walsh-Kaiser Co., Inc.
- Operators: United States Navy
- Built: 1944–1945
- Completed: 32

General characteristics
- Type: S4-SE2-BE1
- Displacement: 4,087 tons
- Length: 426 ft (130 m)
- Beam: 58 ft (18 m)
- Draft: 16 ft (5 m)
- Speed: 16.9 kn (31 km/h)
- Complement: 303 (varies)
- Armament: 1 × 5-inch 38 caliber dual-purpose gun mount; 4 × twin 40 mm gun mounts; 10 × 20 mm guns gun mounts

The Artemis-class attack cargo ships were a series of attack cargo ships (AKAs) built by Walsh-Kaiser Company of Cranston and Providence, Rhode Island, during World War II.

Like all AKAs, they were designed to carry combat loaded military cargo and landing craft, and to use the latter to land weapons, supplies, and troops on enemy shores during amphibious operations. Compared to other classes of AKAs, the Artemis class had a much shallower draft, and a lower main deck aft. All these ships were built on the same standard hull design, but there were some differences from ship to ship: The hull was a S-Type Special-Purpose Ships, same as S3-M2-K2 Landing Ship, Tank.

The armament varied, as did that of the other ships of the day. During 1944–1945, the 5"/38-caliber gun was recognized as the best gun for the dual role of antiaircraft and naval gunfire support, and the 40 mm gun was seen as the best antiaircraft gun. The older 20 mm and .50 caliber guns had been recognized to be of limited value, and were being phased out, though they appeared on some of these ships. The 20 mm guns were later removed from all of them, but it is not clear just when this happened.

The complement varied as well, but the DANFS figures sometimes seem to confuse ship's company with embarked troops in determining a ship's complement.

== See also ==
- Andromeda-class attack cargo ship
- Arcturus-class attack cargo ship
- Charleston-class amphibious cargo ship
- Tolland-class attack cargo ship
- Haskell-class attack transport
- List of United States Navy amphibious warfare ships
