= 840 Zenobia =

Minor planet

Discovery
- Discovered by: Max Wolf
- Discovery site: Heidelberg
- Discovery date: 25 September 1916

Designations
- Pronunciation: /zɛˈnoʊbiə/
- Alternative designations: 1916 AK

Orbital characteristics
- Epoch 31 July 2016 (JD 2457600.5)
- Uncertainty parameter 0
- Observation arc: 99.23 yr (36243 d)
- Aphelion: 3.4448 AU (515.33 Gm)
- Perihelion: 2.8197 AU (421.82 Gm)
- Semi-major axis: 3.1322 AU (468.57 Gm)
- Eccentricity: 0.099775
- Orbital period (sidereal): 5.54 yr (2024.8 d)
- Mean anomaly: 73.117°
- Mean motion: 0° 10^{m} 40.08^{s} / day
- Inclination: 9.9848°
- Longitude of ascending node: 272.773°
- Argument of perihelion: 10.358°
- Earth MOID: 1.80367 AU (269.825 Gm)
- Jupiter MOID: 1.68787 AU (252.502 Gm)
- T_{Jupiter}: 3.182

Physical characteristics
- Synodic rotation period: 5.565 h (0.2319 d)
- Absolute magnitude (H): 10.0

840 Zenobia is a minor planet orbiting the Sun. It was discovered by German astronomer Max Wolf at Heidelberg on September 25, 1916. The origin of the name is uncertain, but it may be named after the Slavic god of the hunt.

Photometric observations of the asteroid during 2006 at the Palmer Divide Observatory in Colorado Springs, Colorado, were used to generate a light curve with a period of 5.565 ± 0.005 hours and a variation in brightness of 0.20 ± 0.02 magnitude.
