= USS Mobile (LKA-115) =

Cargo Ship

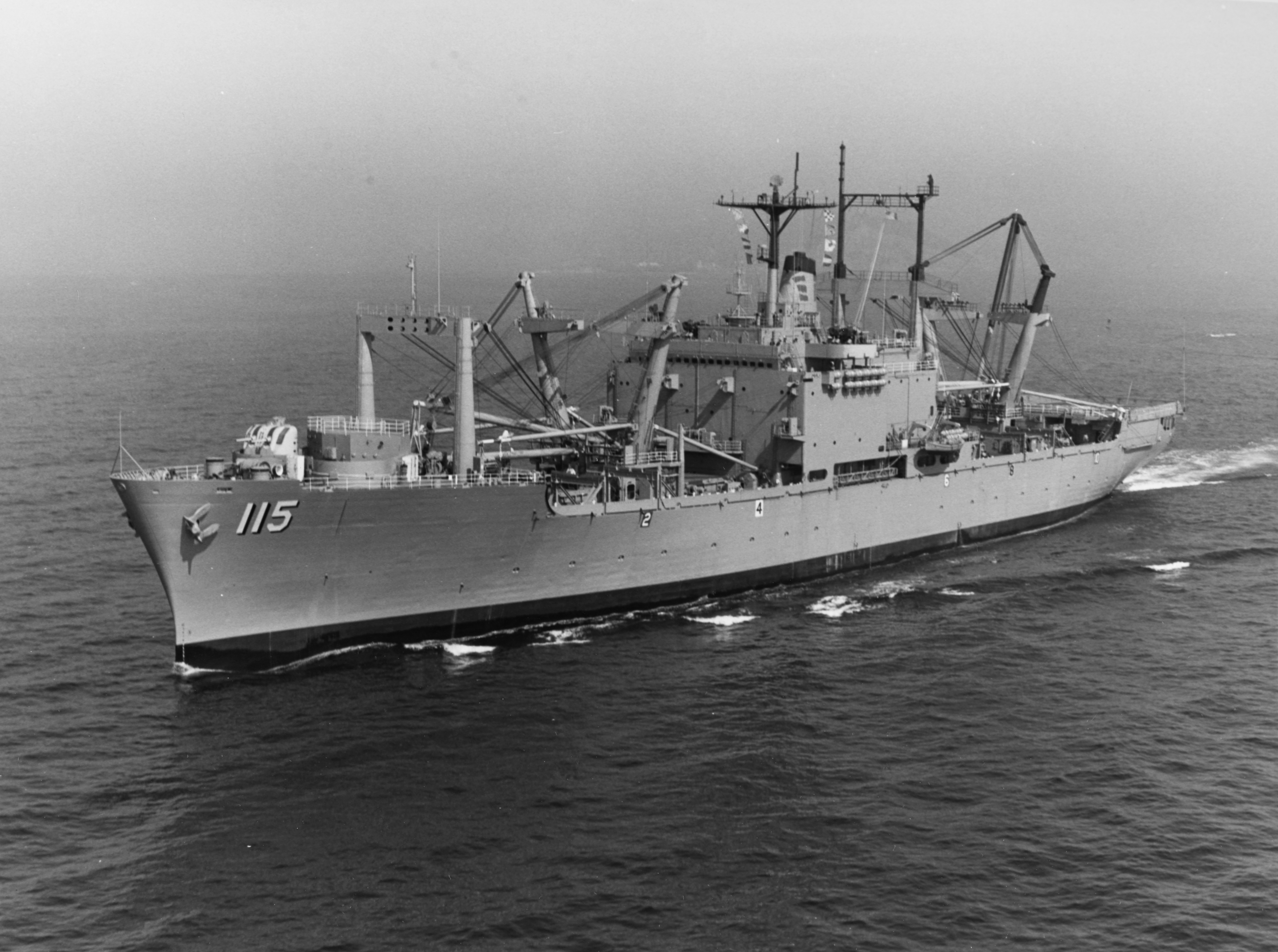

History

United States
- Name: USS Mobile
- Namesake: Mobile, Alabama
- Builder: Newport News Shipbuilding and Dry Dock Co.
- Laid down: 15 January 1968
- Launched: 19 October 1968
- Commissioned: 20 September 1969
- Decommissioned: 25 February 1994
- Stricken: 31 August 2015
- Status: scrapped

General characteristics
- Class & type: Charleston-class amphibious cargo ship
- Displacement: 8,368 tons (light); 18,600 tons(full load)
- Length: 575 ft 6 in (175.41 m)
- Beam: 82 ft (25 m)
- Draft: 25 ft 5 in (7.75 m)
- Boats & landing craft carried: 18 × LCM-8 and LCM-6 landing craft
- Complement: 50 officers, 592 men
- Armament: 4 × twin 3"/50 caliber guns

Service record
- Operations: Vietnam War; Gulf War

USS Mobile (AKA-115/LKA-115) was a Charleston class amphibious cargo ship named after the city of Mobile, Alabama. She was the fourth U.S. Navy ship to bear that name. She served as a commissioned ship for 24 years and 4 months. LKAs had the distinction of being the only ships in the "Gator Navy" that were not flat bottom. They would drop anchor several hundred yards offshore and use their Mike 8s (LCM-8) and Mike 6s (LCM-6) to ferry in the Marines and their equipment.

The name was assigned on 6 November 1967, and the ship was laid down at the Newport News Shipbuilding and Dry Dock Co., Newport News, VA, 15 January 1968 as AKA-115. As of the date of her article in DANFS, she was still under construction, and was scheduled to be completed in early spring 1969.

Mobile was extensively involved in the Vietnam War.

In April 1975, Mobile participated in Operation Frequent Wind, the evacuation of Saigon, Vietnam.

Mobile took part in WestPac 84 and was involved in numerous operations. In the Gulf War, she was part of an 18-ship amphibious task force that was the largest such force since the Korean War. The task force arrived on station in the North Arabian Sea on 12 January 1991.

The ship was decommissioned on 4 February 1994 at Long Beach, California and moved to the Naval Inactive Ship Maintenance Facility in Philadelphia, Pennsylvania, where it was laid up.

On 29 September 2023, Mobile was removed from the Philadelphia NIMSF and towed to Brownsville, Texas, where it will be scrapped. It arrived in Brownsville on 12 October 2023.

Mobile earned 15 awards and campaign ribbons for her service.

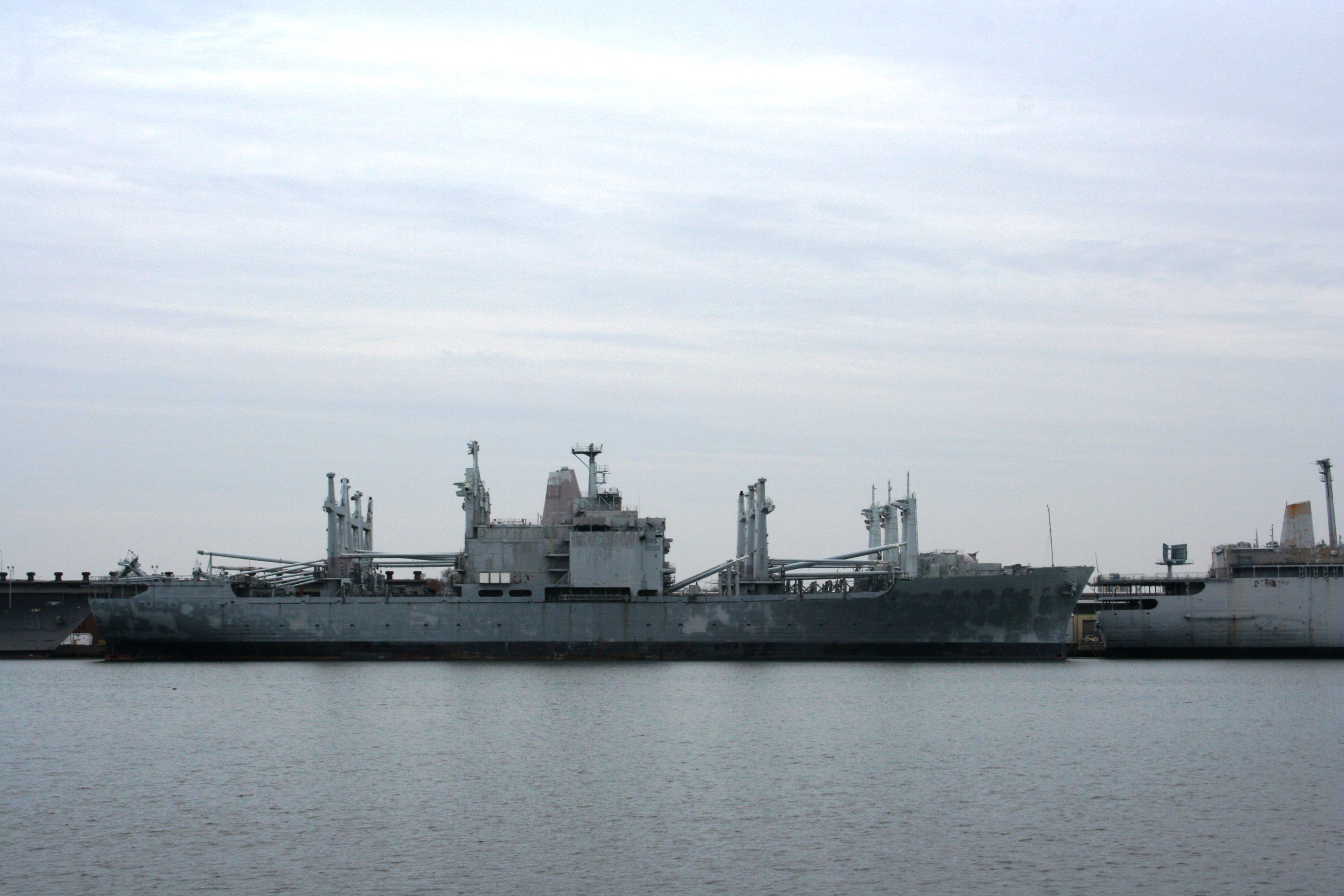
USS Mobile mothballed at Philadelphia NISMF, in January 2008.
