= Charleston-class amphibious cargo ship =

United States Navy ships (1968–1994)

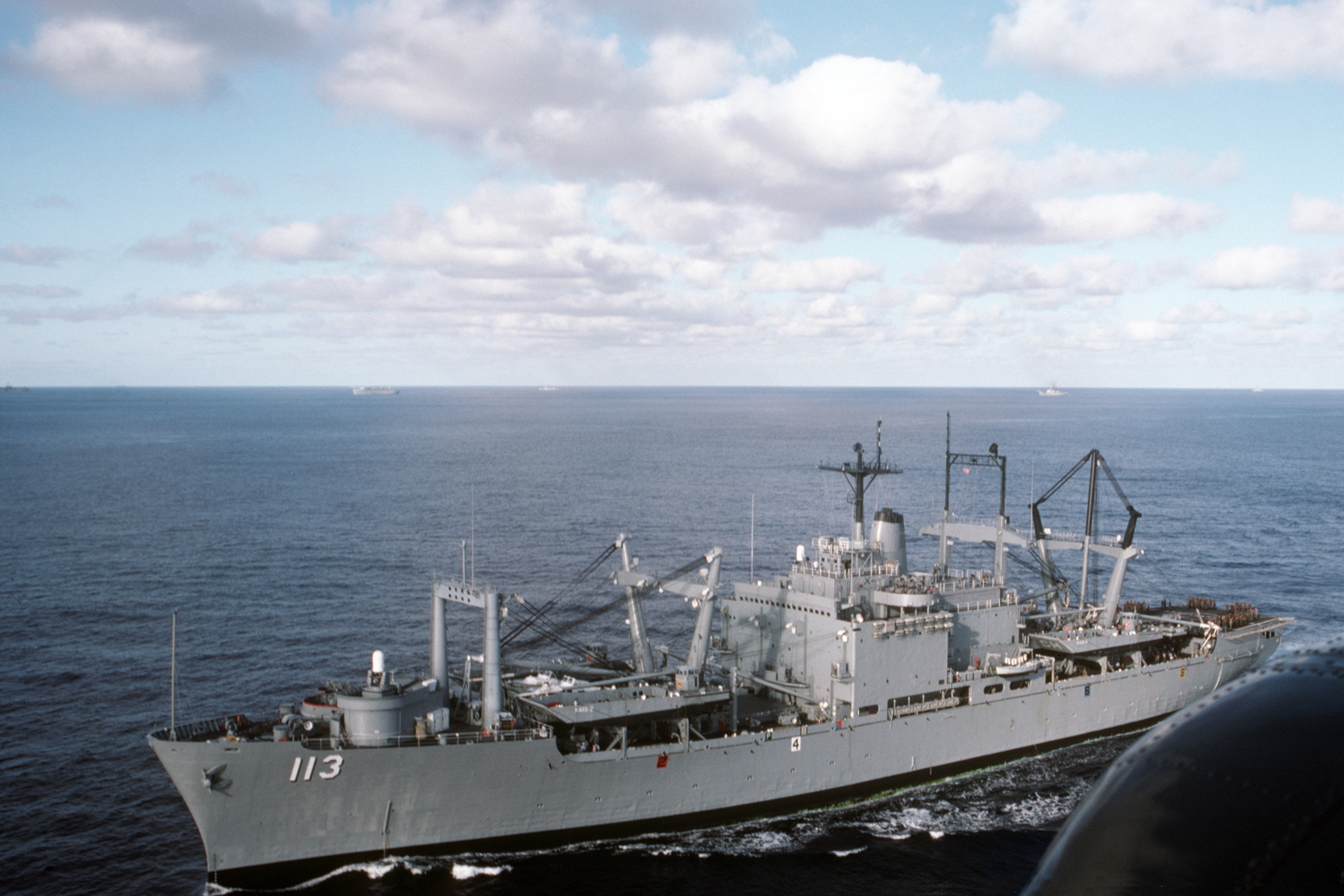
- USS CharlestonUSS Charleston (LKA-113) in 1988

Class overview
- Builders: Newport News Shipbuilding and Dry Dock Co.
- Built: 1966–1969
- In commission: 1968–1994
- Completed: 5
- Retired: 5

General characteristics
- Type: Amphibious cargo ship
- Displacement: ~9,000 tons (light); ~18,500 tons (full load)
- Length: 576 ft (176 m)
- Beam: 82 ft (25 m)
- Draft: 26 ft (7.9 m)
- Propulsion: Steam Turbine
- Speed: 20 knots (37 km/h)
- Boats & landing craft carried: Up to 18 landing craft
- Complement: 50 officers, 592 men
- Armament: 4 × twin 3"/50 caliber guns
- Aviation facilities: Helicopter landing platform

The Charleston-class amphibious cargo ships were a class of amphibious cargo ships in service with the United States Navy. These ships served in Amphibious Readiness Groups between 1968 and 1994. The ships were the last amphibious cargo ships built for the U.S. Navy, their role having been taken over by the San Antonio-class of amphibious transport dock.

== Service ==
Built in the late 1960s, these ships participated in the Vietnam War. Four of the five ships in the class had been transferred to the reserve fleet in the late 1970s and early 1980s. The need for additional sealift capacity resulted in all four being returned to the active fleet in 1982. They were among the first Navy ships to have a fully automated main propulsion plant (600-pound pressure with superheat, known as a "Super Six."). The lead ship of the class, Charleston was decommissioned in 1992, and was joined by St. Louis in November 1992. The remaining ships were decommissioned in 1994. All ships were mothballed for possible activation in the future.

== Design ==
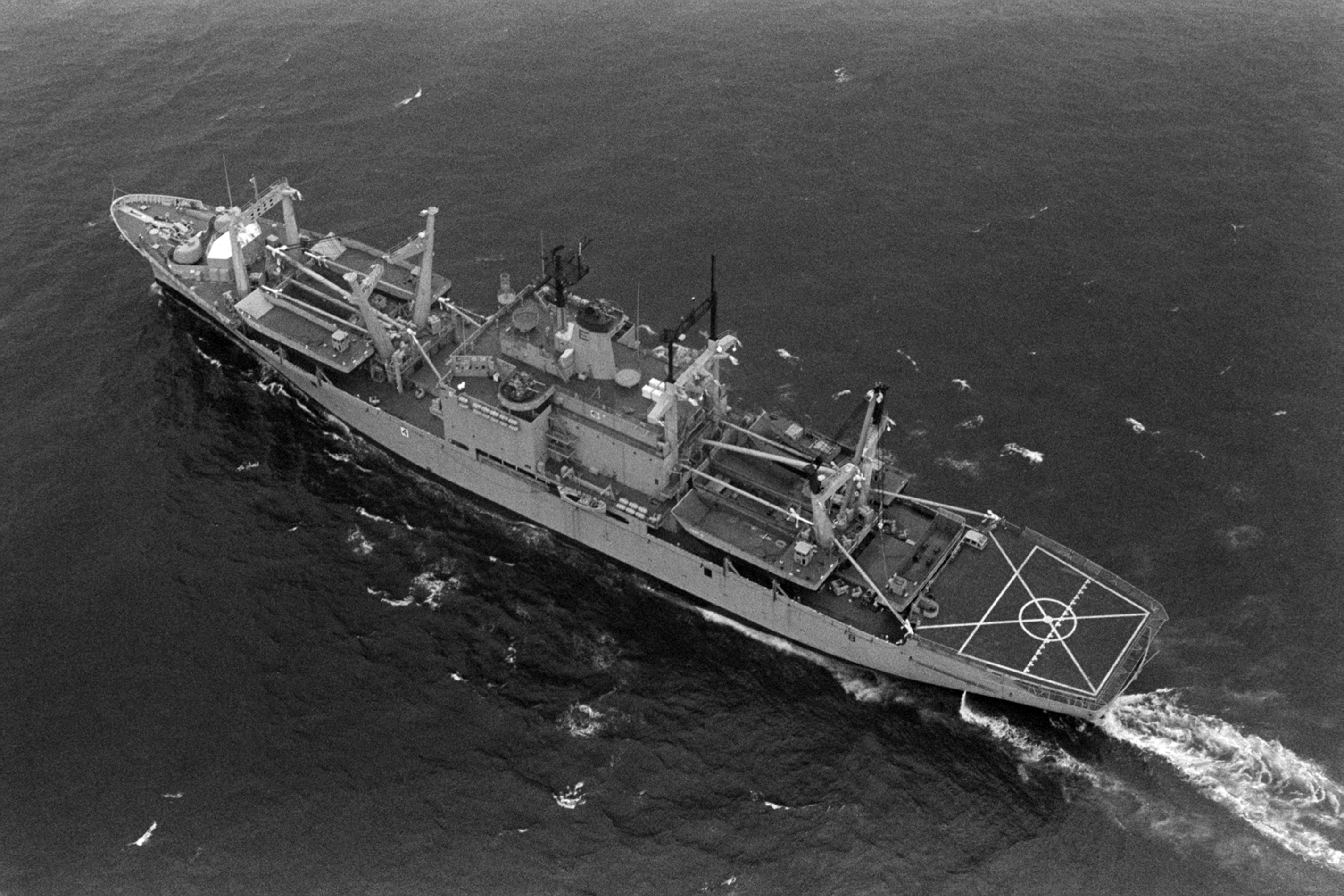
USS El Paso shows the general layout of the Charleston-class.

The assigned mission of the amphibious cargo ship was to transport and land combat equipment and material with attendant personnel in an amphibious assault. To optimize their capability for combat loading, they provided considerable flexibility in cargo stowage methods. The cargo elevators servicing holds 1, 3, and 4 made all categories of supplies and all levels available simultaneously to either the main deck or the helicopter platform. Use of the ship's forklifts and pallet transporters sped the maneuvering of cargo in the holds and enabled delivery to various debarkation stations via the main deck passageways, which ran the length of the ship. The arrangement and quantity of booms and cargo elevators made it possible to simultaneously embark/debark vehicles and cargo.

Vehicles in upper stowage spaces could be embarked/debarked through the hatches with cargo booms, while pallets were embarked/debarked in lower stowage spaces by elevators. The main deck hatch of hold 2 was unobstructed and could be opened for embarking/debarking of vehicles without the delay of unloading landing craft stowed on the hatch. Hold 4 was well suited for high priority cargo because of its direct access to the flight deck or main deck via elevator number 5.

== Ships ==
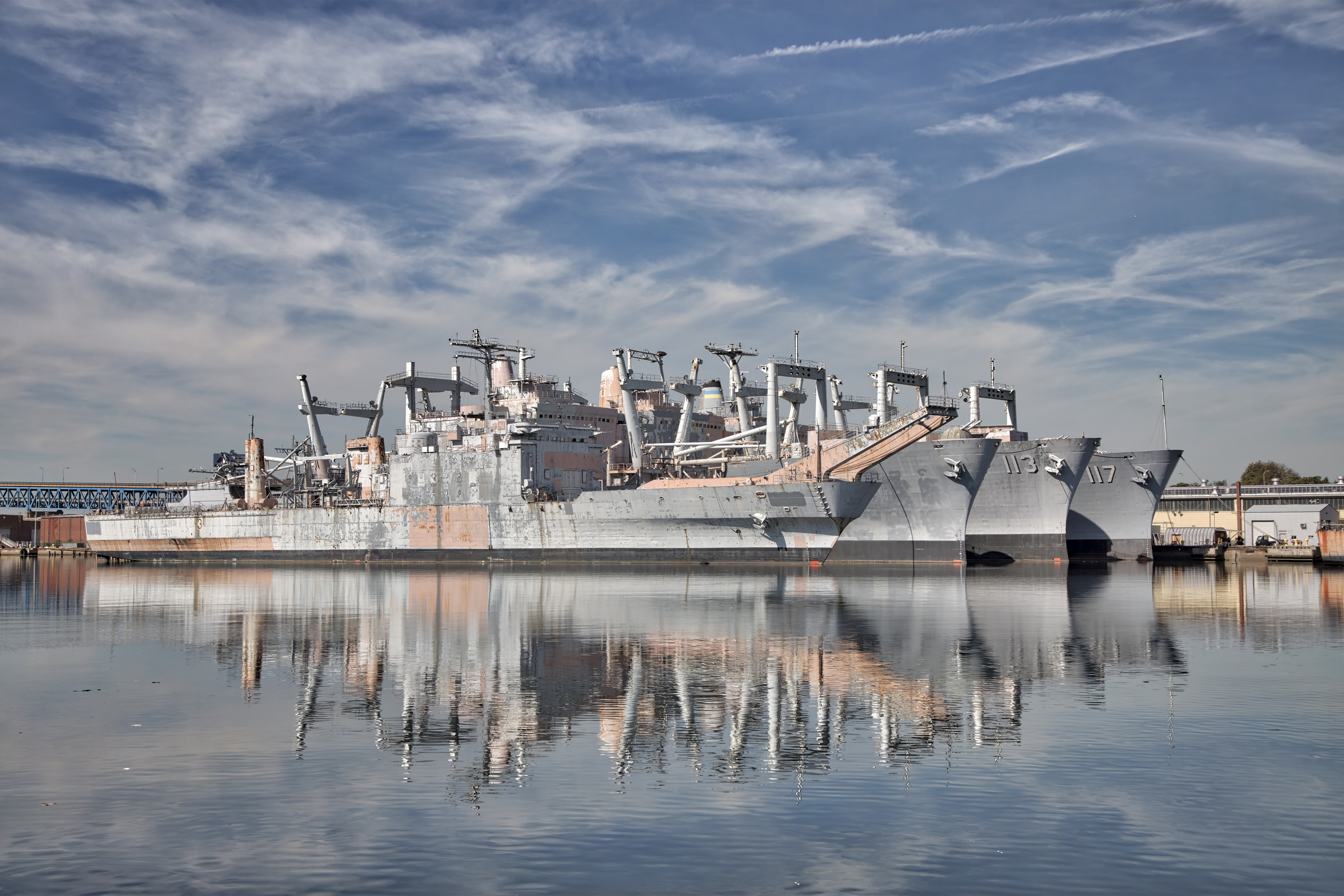
USS Boulder, Charleston, Mobile and El Paso in mothballs at Philadelphia, in October 2017.

| Ship | Launched | Commissioned | Decommissioned | Fate | Ref |
|---|---|---|---|---|---|
| USS Charleston (LKA-113) | 2 December 1967 | 14 December 1968 | 27 April 1992 | Towed to scrapyard | |
| USS Durham (LKA-114) | 29 March 1968 | 24 May 1969 | 25 February 1994 | Sunk as a target 30 August 2020 | |
| USS Mobile (LKA-115) | 19 October 1968 | 29 September 1969 | 25 February 1994 | Arrived for scrapping at Brownsville, Texas 12 October 2023 | |
| USS St. Louis (LKA-116) | 4 January 1969 | 22 November 1969 | 2 November 1992 | Sunk as a target 21 September 2018 | |
| USS El Paso (LKA-117) | 17 May 1969 | 17 January 1970 | 21 April 1994 | Arrived for scrapping at Brownsville, Texas 12 October 2023 | |

== See also ==
- Andromeda-class attack cargo ship
- Arcturus-class attack cargo ship
- Artemis-class attack cargo ship
- Tolland-class attack cargo ship
- List of United States Navy amphibious warfare ships
