= USS El Paso (LKA-117) =

Charleston-class amphibious cargo ship

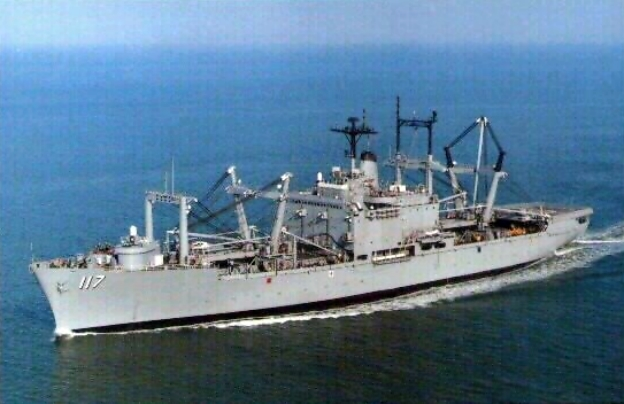
- USS El Paso (LKA-117) after the addition of Phalanx CIWS

History

United States
- Name: USS El Paso
- Namesake: El Paso, Texas
- Builder: Newport News Shipbuilding and Dry Dock Co.
- Laid down: Oct. 22, 1968
- Launched: May 17, 1969
- Commissioned: Jan. 17, 1970
- Decommissioned: April 21, 1994
- Stricken: Aug. 31, 2015
- Home port: Norfolk, Virginia
- Nickname(s): El Barco Magnifico
- Fate: Scrapped
- Status: Scrapped

General characteristics
- Class & type: Charleston-class amphibious cargo ship
- Tonnage: 8,368 DWT
- Displacement: 18,600 tons (full load)
- Length: 575 ft 6 in (175.41 m)
- Beam: 82 ft (25 m)
- Draft: 25 ft 5 in (7.75 m)
- Boats & landing craft carried: 9 × landing craft
- Complement: 36 officers, 375 enlisted
- Armament: As built: 4 × twin 3-inch/50-caliber guns; Later fitted: 2 × 20 mm Phalanx CIWS

USS El Paso (AKA-117/LKA-117) is a Charleston-class amphibious cargo ship named after the city of El Paso, Texas. She served as a commissioned ship for 24 years and three months.

== History ==
She was laid down as AKA-117 at the Newport News Shipbuilding and Dry Dock Company in Newport News, Virginia, on October 22, 1968. Redesignated LKA-117 on January 1, 1969, she was launched on May 17, 1969, and commissioned on January 17, 1970.

She was home-ported at Naval Station Norfolk, Virginia. Her operations included embarking a Marine Amphibious Ready Group and transporting the MARG to the Mediterranean Sea for a six-month deployment. In 1979 she deployed to the Mediterranean and eventually redirected to the Indian Ocean and Diego Garcia during the Iran Hostage Crisis. For that she was awarded the Navy Expeditionary Medal. In 1993 she again deployed to the Indian Ocean and the Persian Gulf to participate in Operation Restore Hope in Somalia. She was decommissioned on April 21, 1994, and moved to the Naval Inactive Ship Maintenance Facility in Philadelphia, Pennsylvania, where the vessel was laid up.

On 29 September 2023, El Paso was removed from the Philadelphia NIMSF and towed to Brownsville, Texas, where it was scrapped. The ship arrived at Brownsville on 12 October 2023.

== Awards ==
The ship earned several additional awards and campaign ribbons for her service.

She has had two noteworthy commanding officers. Captain Edward Clexton Jr, commanded the ship from March 1979 through August 1980. During his tenure, the crew were awarded the Navy Expeditionary Medal for the Iran Hostage Crisis. Captain Clexton went on to command the aircraft carrier USS Dwight D. Eisenhower. Clexton retired as a vice admiral in 1993 as Deputy CINCUSNAVEUR. Captain Roy Cash, nephew of singer Johnny Cash and father of Miss America 1987 winner Kellye Cash, served as her commanding officer from August 1985 to March 1987.
