= Combat loading =

Type of unit loading of ships

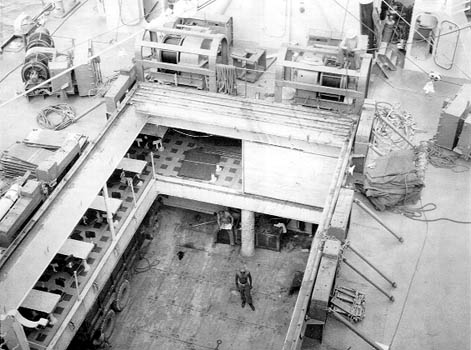
One of an AKA's cargo holds. The upper level is the main deck, with cargo-handling winches visible. The lower level is the floor onto which cargo is combat loaded. In between is the mess deck where the crew eats their meals.

Combat loading is a special type of unit loading of ships so that embarked forces will have immediately needed weapons, ammunition and supplies stowed in such a way that unloading of equipment will be concurrent with the force personnel and available for immediate combat during an amphibious landing. It gives primary consideration to the ease and sequence with which troops, equipment, and supplies can be unloaded ready for combat, rather than to the efficient use of cargo space as in convoy loading where forces and equipment would be joined in rear or secure areas. The art and science of combat loading were developed in World War II, and contributed greatly to the success of Allied amphibious campaigns. While combat loading usually took place in forward bases, the Western Task Force for the landings in North Africa was combat loaded at the Army's Hampton Roads Port of Embarkation which was called on again for the Sicily force.

Joint exercises in 1941 resulted in a decision that the Navy would be responsible for providing the transports for joint operations against enemy resistance. As the war progressed specialized types of ships were developed for the United States Navy, generally termed combat loaders, and specifically designated APA (transport, attack), and AKA (cargo ship, attack). Army doctrine, after some discussion as to whether the port commander or force commander should be responsible, settled on the commander of the landing force being responsible for combat loading Army forces. Combat loading for Army in the Pacific was organized under the Army Port and Service Command as directed by force commanders. Navy attack cargo ships were assigned a specially-trained Marine Corps officer called the "transport quartermaster" or "combat cargo officer" to oversee their proper combat loading.

When a ship is combat loaded, each item must be stored so it can be unloaded at a time and in a sequence that will most effectively support the planned activities ashore. Whenever possible, the loading scheme must also provide flexibility to accommodate changes in the tactical plan, and to allow access to cargo that is required to meet emergency calls for equipment or supplies.

== Methods ==
There are three basic methods of arranging items in a cargo hold:

Horizontally
Where a single item or class of items—say, rifle ammunition—is stored in a layer that fills the hold from side to side and front to rear. This allows maximum access to the item once it is uncovered.

Vertically
Where like items are stored in columns that go from the top of the hold on down, so that several types of items are available during any stage of emptying the hold. This means that if four different items, such as food, water, medical supplies, and ammunition, are stored in a single hold, each of these supplies would be accessible without first unloading a layer of another one.

In blocks
Where assortments of various types of items are made up and loaded together. With this system, a balanced proportion of the entire cargo can be unloaded without disturbing the rest of the cargo.

Combat loading normally requires the use of each of these methods, with the vertical and block method predominating.

== Bibliography ==
- Bykofsky, Joseph; Larson, Harold (1990). The Technical Services – The Transportation Corps: Operations Overseas. United States Army in World War II. Washington, DC: Center of Military History, United States Army. LCCN 56060000.
- Headquarters, Department of the Army (1997). FM 55-15 (PDF). United States Department of the Army.
- Huston, James A. (1997). The Sinews of War: Army Logistics 1775–1953. Army Historical Series. Washington: Center of Military History (CMH Pub 30-4). LCCN 66060015.
- United States War Department (1944). FM 55-105. United States Department of War.
- Wardlow, Chester (1999). The Technical Services – The Transportation Corps: Responsibilities, Organization, and Operations. United States Army in World War II. Washington, DC: Center of Military History, United States Army. LCCN 99490905.
