= Amphibious cargo ship =

Type of U.S. Navy ship

Amphibious cargo ships were U.S. Navy ships designed specifically to carry troops, heavy equipment and supplies in support of amphibious assaults, and to provide naval gunfire support during those assaults. A total of 108 of these ships were built between 1943 and 1945—which worked out to an average of one ship every eight days. Six additional AKAs, featuring new and improved designs, were built in later years. They were originally called Attack Cargo Ships and designated AKA. In 1969, they were renamed as Amphibious Cargo Ships and redesignated LKA.

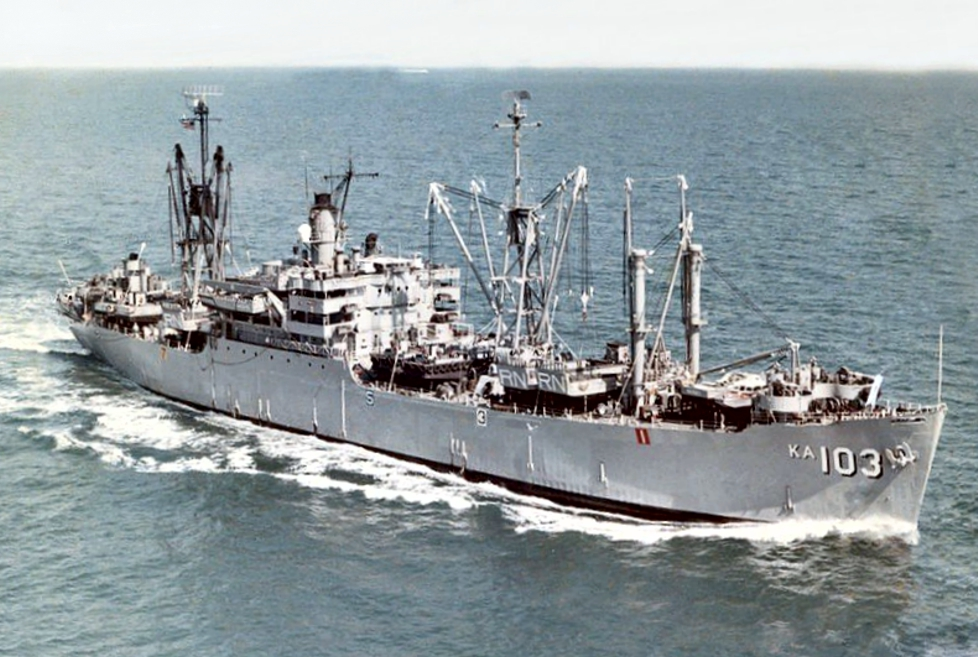
Amphibious Cargo Ship USS Rankin (AKA-103 / LKA-103)

Compared to other cargo ship types, these ships could carry landing craft, were faster, had more armament, and had larger hatches and booms. Their holds were optimized for combat loading, a method of cargo storage where the items first needed ashore were at the top of the hold, and those needed later were lower down. Because these ships went into forward combat areas, they had Combat Information Centers and significant amounts of equipment for radio communication, neither of which were present in other cargo ships.

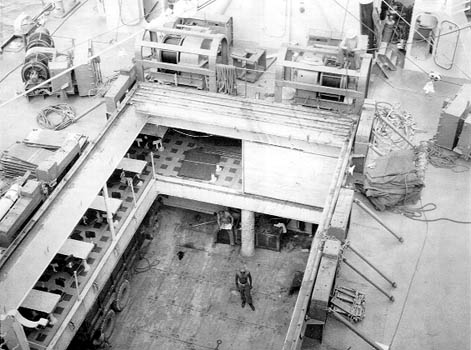
One of USS Rankin's cargo holds. The upper level is the main deck, with cargo-handling winches visible. The lower level is the floor onto which cargo is combat loaded. In between is the mess deck where the crew eats their meals.

As amphibious operations became more important in World War II, planners saw the need for a special kind of cargo ship, one that could carry both cargo and the LCM and LCVP boats with which to attack the beach, and that carried guns to assist in anti-air defense and shore bombardment. Specifications were drawn up, and beginning in early 1943, the first 16 U.S. attack cargo ships were converted from Navy cargo ships that had previously been designated AK. During the course of the war, 108 such ships were built; many of them were converted from non-military ships, or started out as non-military hulls.

Attack cargo ships played a vital role in the Pacific War, where many were attacked by kamikazes and other aircraft, and several were torpedoed, but none were sunk or otherwise destroyed. Nine AKAs were present at the surrender ceremony in Tokyo Bay on 2 September 1945.

After the war, many AKAs were put into the National Defense Reserve Fleet. Others were converted for other uses, such as oceanographic surveying, undersea cable laying, and repairing other ships.

Some of the reserve ships were recommissioned for service in the Korean War, and some stayed in service during the Vietnam War.

Six more amphibious cargo ships, somewhat faster, larger and of improved design regarding cargo handling, were built between 1954 and 1969: the USS Tulare (APA/LKA-112) and the Charleston-class.

In 1969, the U.S. Navy redesignated all its remaining AKA attack cargo ships as LKA amphibious cargo ships. At the same time, several other "A" designations of amphibious ships were changed to similar "L" designations; for example, all the attack troop transport APAs were redesignated as LPAs.

In the 1960s, both the United States Navy and the British Royal Navy developed amphibious transport docks which gradually took on this unique amphibious role and today have assumed it completely. The last amphibious cargo ship in the U. S. Navy, USS El Paso (LKA-117), was decommissioned in April 1994.

== Classes ==
- Type C1 ship
  - Fomalhaut (AKA-5)
- Type C2 ship
  - Alhena (AKA-9)
  - 11 Arcturus class (in the range AKA-1 ... AKA-14)
  - 32 Tolland class (in the range AKA-64 ... AKA-108)
  - 30 Andromeda class (in the range AKA-15 ... AKA-100)
- Type C3 ship
  - Almaack (AKA-10)
- Type S4 ship
  - 32 Artemis class (AKA-21 ... AKA-52)
- Type C4 ship
  - Tulare (AKA-112)
- 5 Charleston class (LKA-113 ... LKA-117)

== See also ==
- Attack transport (APA/LPA). Nearly identical ships used to transport troops and landing craft.
- List of United States Navy amphibious warfare ships § Attack Cargo Ship (AKA)
- List of United States Navy amphibious warfare ships § Amphibious Cargo Ship (LKA)—AKA redesignation
