= List of historical ships of the Brazilian Navy =

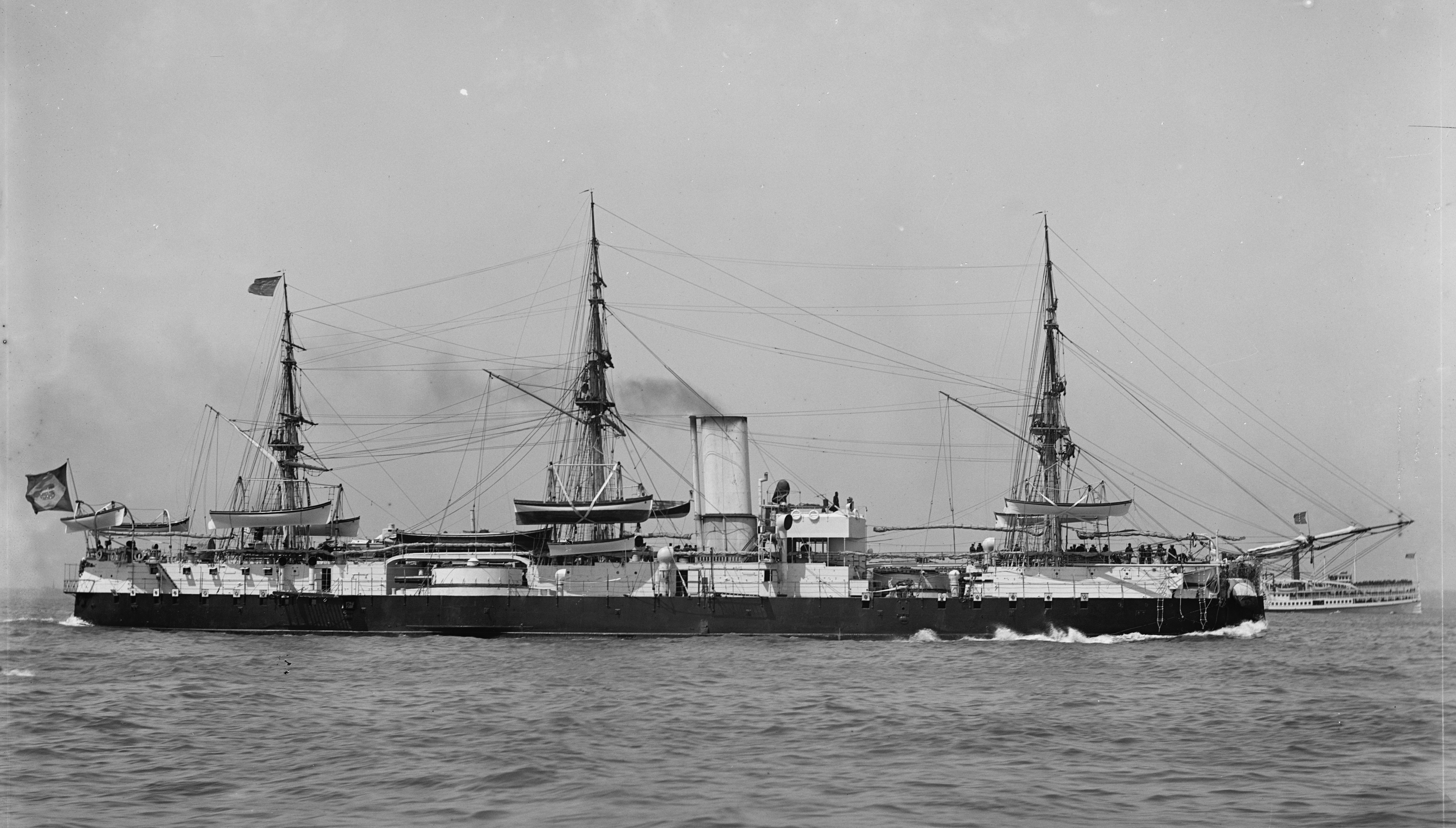
The pre-dreadnought battleship Aquidabã

This list includes all historical Brazilian Navy ships from both the Empire of Brazil and subsequent Republican period, that have been in service in the history of the Brazilian Navy and have been retired. Many of them have taken part in the War of Independence, Cisplatine War, Paraguayan War, Naval Revolt, and all major battles and conflicts as part of the Brazilian Armed Forces. For active ships refer to the list. Many ships are named after famous Brazilian military officers such as Joaquim Marques Lisboa. The United States and United States Navy have been the biggest suppliers to the Brazilian Navy since World War Two in the Republic era. Although during the Imperial Era and the Republic Era, Brazil sourced its ships from domestic shipyards, many ships were also built in Portugal, United Kingdom, France, Germany and Italy.

== Imperial Navy ==
Class	Type	Origin	In Service	Per unit (Name)	Picture	Displacement	Source
Bertioga	Schooner	Unknown	?–1827				
Maceió	Corvette	Brazil	?–1827				
Maria Teresa	Schooner	Portugal	?–1827				
Oriental	Schooner	Brazil	?–1827				
Dona Januária	Schooner	Brazil	?–1845				
Maria da Glória	Corvette	United States	1822–?				
Real Carolina	Frigate	Portugal	1822–?				
Príncipe Real	Ship of the line	Portugal	1822–?				
Vasco da Gama	Ship of the line	Portugal	1822–1827				
Pedro I	Ship of the line	Portugal	1822–1833				
Nichteroy	Frigate	Portugal	1822–1838				
Tétis	Frigate	Portugal	1823–?				
Real	Brig	Portugal	1823–1827				
Liberal	Corvette	Portugal	1823–184?				
Imperatriz	Frigate	Brazil	1824–1836				
Dona Paula	Frigate	United Kingdom	1825–1827				
Alcântara	Schooner	United Kingdom	1825–1830				
Constituição	Frigate	United States	1826–188?				
Alcides	Troopship	Portugal	1827–1841				
Campista	Frigate	Brazil	1827–1846				
Duquesa de Goiás	Brig	United States	1828–?				
Bahiana	Frigate	Brazil	1830–1836				
Dona Amélia	Corvette	Brazil	1831–1847			594 ton	
Achada	Schooner	Unknown	1836–?				
Águia	Steamer	Unknown	1837–1858				
Abaeté	Patache	Brazil	1839–?				
Calíope	Brig	Brazil	1839–1860			194 ton	
Dona Francisca	Corvette	Brazil	1845–?			637 ton	
Dom Afonso	Frigate	United Kingdom	1847–1853			900 ton	
Recife	Corvette	Brazil	1850–1880				
Bahiana	Corvette	Brazil	1850–1893			972 ton	
Dom Pedro II	Corvette	Brazil	1851–1861				
Amazonas	Frigate	United Kingdom	1852–1897			1,800 ton	
Beberibe	Corvette	United Kingdom	1853–1881			637 ton	
Ypiranga	Gunboat	Brazil	1854–?			350 ton	
Jequitinhonha	Corvette	United Kingdom	1854–1865			647 ton	
Ivahy	Gunboat	United Kingdom	1858–?			400 ton	
Anhambaí	Gunboat	United Kingdom	1858–1865				
Parnahyba	Corvette	France	1858–1868			637 ton	
Iguatemi	Corvette	United Kingdom	1858–1873			400 ton	
Belmonte	Corvette	France	1858–1876			602 ton	
Araguari	Gunboat	United Kingdom	1858–1882			400 ton	
Nichteroy	Corvette	Brazil	1863–1891			1,819 ton	
Brasil	Ironclad	Brazil	1865–1879			1,518 ton	
Tamandaré	Ironclad	Brazil	1865–1879			775 ton	
Rio de Janeiro	Ironclad	Brazil	1866–1866			874 ton	
Mariz e Barros-class	Ironclad	United Kingdom	1866–1897; 1866–1879	1 – Mariz e Barros; 2 – Herval		1,197 ton	
Cabral-class	Ironclad	United Kingdom	1865–1880; 1865–1880	1 – Cabral; 2 – Colombo		1,100 ton	
Silvado	Ironclad	Brazil	1866–1885			2,350 ton	
Bahia	Monitor	United Kingdom	1866–1894			928 ton	
Barroso	Ironclad	Brazil	1866–1882			980 ton	
Pará-class monitor	Monitor	Brazil	1866–1884; 1866–1907; 1867–1900; 1868–1893; 1868–1884; 1868–1882	1 – Pará; 2 – Rio Grande; 3 – Alagoas; 4 – Piauí; 5 – Ceará; 6 – Santa Catharina		490 ton	
Lima Barros	Ironclad	Brazil	1866–1905			1,700 ton	
Javari-class	Monitor	France	1873–1893; 1875–1893	1 – Javary; 2 – Solimões		3,700 ton	
Trajano	Cruiser	Brazil	1873–1906			1,414 ton	
Sete de Setembro	Ironclad	Brazil	1874–1885			2,174 ton	
Almirante Barroso	Cruiser	Brazil	1882–1893			2,050 ton	
Afonso Celso Class	Gunboat	Brazil	1882–1900	Afonso Celso/Trindade		327 ton	.
Torpedeira Nº 1-class	Torpedoboat	United Kingdom	1882–1900	1 – Nº1; 2 – Nº2; 3 – Nº3; 4 – Nº4; 5 – Nº5			.
Alfa-class	Torpedoboat	United Kingdom	1883–?	1 – Alfa; 2 – Beta; 3 – Gama		4 ton	
Imperial Marinheiro	Cruiser	Brazil	1884–1887			726 ton	
Riachuelo	Battleship	United Kingdom	1884–1910			5,700 ton	
Marajó	Gunboat	Brazil	?–1893			430 ton	
Aquidabã	Battleship	United Kingdom	1885–1906			5,029 ton	
Iniciadora	Gunboat	Brazil	1885–1907			268 ton	

== Republic Navy ==
Class	Type	Origin	In Service	Per unit (Name)	Picture	Displacement	Source
Carioca class	Gunboat	Brazil	1890–1912	Cananéia		210 ton	
Almirante Tamandaré	Protected Cruiser	Brazil	1890–1915			4,430 ton	
Coureur class	Torpedoboat	United Kingdom	1891–1902	Marcílio Dias; Iguatemi; Araguari		110 ton	
Tiradentes class	Torpedo-Cruiser	United Kingdom	1892–1917	Tiradentes		700 ton	
República	Cruiser	United Kingdom	1892–1920			1,231 ton	
Sabino Vieira	Torpedoboat	United Kingdom	1893–1901			16 ton	
Pedro Ivo class	Torpedoboat	Germany	1893–1910; 1893–1900; 1893–1912	Pedro Ivo Nº1; Pedro Affonso Nº2; Silvado Nº3; Tamboril Nº4; Bento Gonçalves Nº5		130 ton	
Benjamin Constant	Training ship	France	1894–1926			2,311 ton	
Cannon class	Destroyer	United States	1944–1982	Comandante Bauru		1600 ton	
Gustavo Sampaio class	Destroyer	United Kingdom	1894–1912	Gustavo Sampaio		438 ton	
Pereira da Cunha class	Light Cruiser	Brazil	1893–1894	Pereira da Cunha			
Itas-class	Cargo Ship	United Kingdom	1898–1915	Comandante Freitas			
Almirante Barroso	Protected Cruiser	United Kingdom	1896–1931			3,400 ton	
Deodoro-class	Coastal Defence Battleship	France	1898–1924; 1900–1934	1 – Deodoro; 2 – Floriano		3,160 ton	
Tupi-class	Torpedo boat	Germany	1897–1915; 1897–1917; 1897–1916	1 – Tupi; 2 – Tymbira; 3 – Tamoio		1,130 ton	
Acre-class	Gunboat	United Kingdom	1906–1921; 1906–1917; 1906–1917; 1906–1933	1 – Acre; 2 – Amapá; 3 – Jurua; 4 – Missões		200 ton	
Goyaz class	Torpedo boat	United Kingdom	1907–1933	Goyaz		56 ton	
Pará class	Destroyer	Brazil	1908–1933; 1908–1944; 1908–1931; 1908–1946; 1909–1944; 1909–1944; 1909–1939; 1909–1944; 1910–1944; 1910–1944	1 – Pará; 2 – Piaui; 3 – Amazonas; 4 – Mato Grosso 5 – Rio Grande do Norte; 6 – Paraiba; 7 – Alagoas; 8 – Santa Catarina; 9 – Parana; 10 – Sergipe		640 ton	
Bahia class	Scout cruiser	United Kingdom	1909–1945 1909–1948	1 – Bahia 2 – Rio Grande do Sul		3,100 ton	
Minas Geraes class	Battleship	United Kingdom	1910–1952 1910–1947	1 – Minas Geraes 2 – São Paulo		20,000 ton	
Laurindo Pitta	Tugboat	United Kingdom	1910–1998				
Humber class	Monitor	United Kingdom	1914–1920	Solimões		1,260 tons	
Foca or F class	Submarine	Italy	1914–1933	F1; F3; F5		250 tons	
Belmonte class	Auxiliary ship	Germany	1917	Belmonte			
Ceará	Submarine tender, submarine rescue ship, and salvage ship	Italy	1917–1946			4,196 tons	
Acasta class	Destroyer	United Kingdom	1922–1946	Maranhão		940 tons	
Balilla class	Submarine	Italy	1927–1950	Humayta		1,427 tons	
Adua-class	Submarine	Italy	1937–1959; 1937–1959; 1937–1959	S11 Tupy; S12 Tymbira; S13 Tamoyo			
Vital de Oliveira	Auxiliary ship	Brazil	1931–1944	Vital de Oliveira			
Barreto de Menezes class	Light Corvette	Brazil	1942–1959	F1 Fernandes Vieira; F2 Felipe Camarão; F3 Henrique Dias; F4 Matias e Albuquerque; F5 Barreto de Menezes; F6 Vidal de Negreiros			
Orizaba class	Auxiliary ship	United States	1945–1959	U11 Duque de Caxias			
Carioca class	Corvette	Brazil	1939–1949	C1 Carioca; C2 Cananéia; C3 Camocim; C4 Cabedelo; C5 Caravelas; C6 Camaquã		818 ton	
Mettawee class	Gasoline tanker	United States	1944–1970	G18 Rijo; G19 Raza			
Pernambuco class	River monitor	Brazil	1910–1948; 1940–1971	Pernambuco; P1 Paraguassú		650 ton	
PC-461 class	Submarine chaser	United States	1942–1958; 1942–1959; 1943–1952; 1943–1952; 1943–1959; 1943–1951; 1943–1959; 1943–1959	G1 Guaporé; G2 Gurupi; G3 Guaíba; G4 Guarupá; G5 Guajará; G6 Goiânia; G7 Grajaú; G8 Graúna			
Marcílio Dias class	Destroyer	United States; Brazil	1943–1966; 1943–1972; 1943–1966	M1 Marcilio Dias; M2 Mariz e Barros; M3 Greenhalgh		2,000 ton	
Bertioga class	Destroyer	United States	1944–1964; 1944–1973; 1945–1981; 1945–1968; 1945–1964; 1945–1964; 1945–1965; 1945–1973	D16 Babitonga; D17 Baependi; D18 Bauru; D19 Beberibe; D20 Benevente; D21 Bertioga; D22 Bocaina; D23 Bracuí		1,600 ton	
Gato class	Submarine	United States	1957–1968; 1957–1966	S14 Humaitá; S15 Riachuelo			
Stoyomo class	Tugboat	United States	1947–1985; 1947–1985; 1947–1986	R1Tritão; R2Tridente; R3Triunfo			
Acre class	Destroyer	Brazil	1949–1974; 1949–1964; 1949–1973; 1949–1964; 1949–1974; 1949–1974	D10 Acre; D11 Ajuricaba; D12 Amazonas; D13 Apa; D14 Araguarí; D15 Araguaya		1,886 ton	
Collosus class	Aircraft carrier	United Kingdom	1960–2001	Minas Gerais		19,800 ton	
Javarí class	Minesweeper	United States	1960–1982	M11 Javarí; M12 Jutaí; M13 Juruá; M14 Jurena			
Pará class	Destroyer	United States	1959–1983; 1959–1973; 1959–1973; 1961–1982; 1969–1989; 1968–1988; 1972–1990	D27 Para; D28 Paraiba; D29 Paraná; D30 Pernambuco; D31 Piauí; D32 Santa Catarina; D33 Maranhão		3,310 ton	
Aristaeus class	Auxiliary ship	United States	1962–1997	G24 Belmonte			
Mato Grosso class	Destroyer	United States	1972–1990; 1973–1996; 1973–1994; 1973–1995; 1973–1996	D34 Mato Grosso; D35 Sergipe; D36 Alagoas; D37 Rio Grande do Norte; D38 Espirito Santo		3,400 ton	
Guppy II class	Submarine	United States	1972–1983; 1972–1993; 1972–1993; 1978–1981; 1973–1983; 1973–1990; 1973–1992	S10 Guanabara; S11 Rio Grande do Sul; S12 Bahia; S13 Rio de Janeiro; S14 Ceará; S15 Goiás; S16 Amazonas			
Brooklyn class	Light cruiser	United States	1951–1973 1951–1976	C11 Barroso C12 Tamandaré		12,900 ton	
Marcílio Dias class	Destroyer	United States	1973–1994; 1973–1997	D25 Marcílio Dias; D26 Mariz e Barros		3,500 ton	
Oberon class	Submarine	United Kingdom	1973–1996; 1977–2001; 1977–1997	S20 Humaitá; S22 Riachuelo; S21 Tonelero			
Navajo class	Auxiliary ship	United States	1973–1996	K10 Gastão Moutinho			
De Soto County class	Auxiliary ship	United States	1973–2000	G26 Duque de Caxias			
Garcia class	Destroyer	United States	1989–2001; 1989–2004; 1989–2004; 1989–2005	D27 Pará; D28 Paraiba; D29 Parana; D30 Pernambuco		3,600 ton	
Imperial Marinheiro class	Corvette	Netherlands	1955–2005	V15 Imperial Marinheiro; V16 Iguatemi; V17 Ipiranga; V18 Forte Coimbra; V20 Angostura; V21 Bahiana; V22 Mearim; V23 Purus; V24 Solimões			
Custódio de Mello class	Auxiliary ship	Japan	1957–2009	G15 Custódio de Mello; G16 Barroso Pereira; G21 Ary Parreiras; G22 Soares Dutra			
Type 22 frigate	Frigate	United Kingdom	1996–2004; 1996–2015; 1995–2021	F47 Dodsworth; F48 Bosísio; F46 Greenhalgh		4,450 ton	
Ceará class	Auxiliary ship	United States	1990–2012; 1990–2016	G31 Rio de Janeiro; G30 Ceará		11,600 ton	
Inhaúma class	Corvette	Brazil	1986–2017; 1992–2016; 1991–2019	V30 Inhaúma; V33 Frontin; V31 Jaceguaí		1,900 ton	
Marajó class	Tanker	Brazil	1969–2016	G27 Marajó			
Clemenceau class	Aircraft carrier	France	2000–2017	A12 São Paulo		32,750 ton	
Niterói class	Frigate	United Kingdom; Brazil	1974–2019	F40 Niterói		3,800 ton	
Round Table class	Landing ship logistics	United Kingdom	2007–2019	Garcia D'Avila		7,700 ton	
Felinto Perry	Submarine rescue	Norway	1978–2020			2,500 ton	
Tupi class	Attack submarine	Germany; Brazil	1987–2023; 1999–2023; 1994–2023	1 – Timbira; 2 – Tapajó; 3 – Tamoio		1,440 ton	

== See also ==
- List of active Brazilian Navy ships
- List of future ships of the Brazilian Navy
