= MS Wildrake =

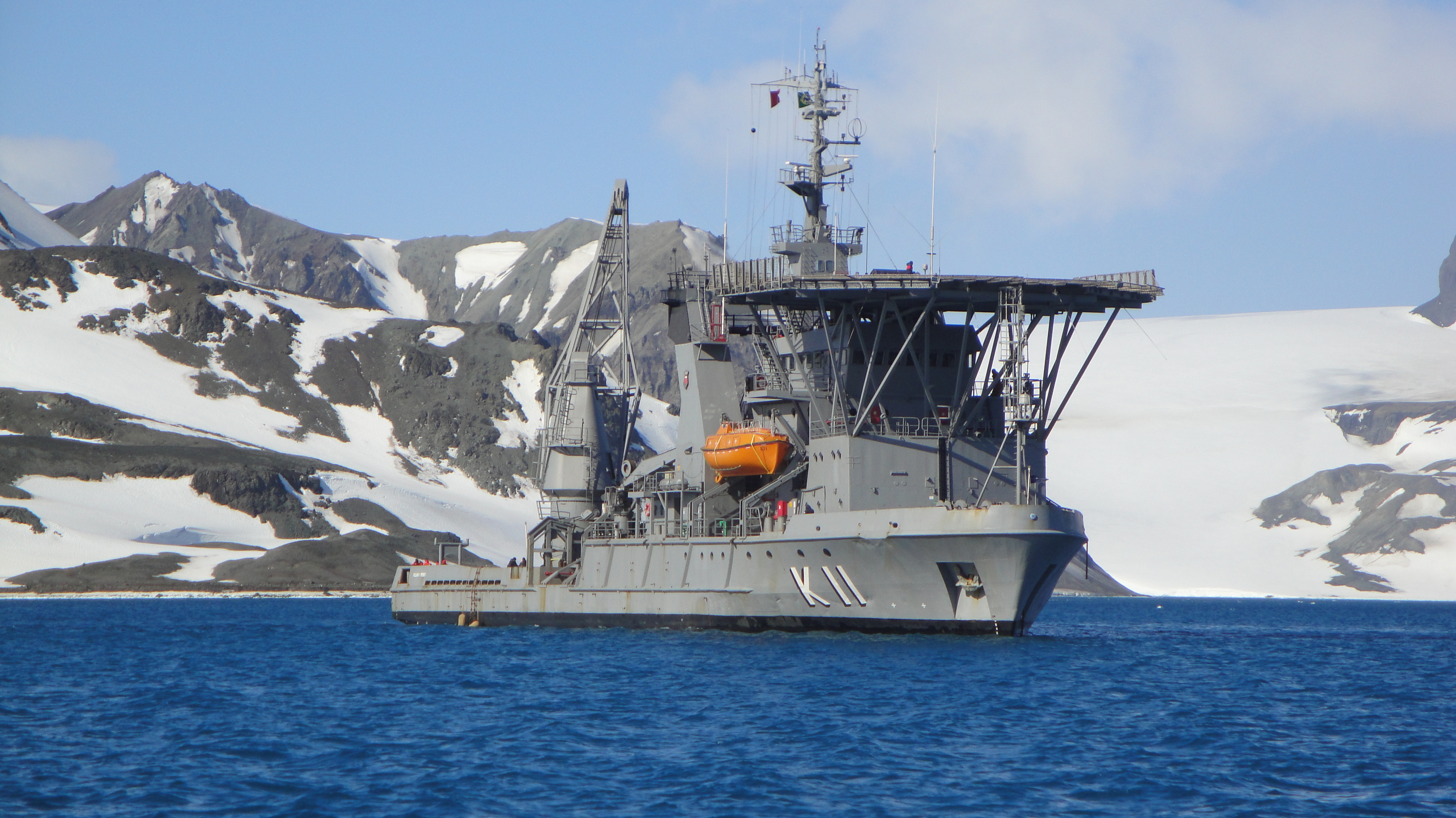
- NSS Flinto Perry underway on 15 May 2012.

History

Norway
- Name: MS Wildrake
- Owner: Anders Wilhelmsen AS
- Ordered: 1977
- Builder: Smedvik Mekaniske Verksted, Norway
- Cost: NOK 62.900.000
- Launched: 28 October 1978
- Completed: 16 July 1979
- Identification: OSL414197902
- Fate: Sold to Denmark in 1986.

History

Denmark
- Name: KS Holger Danske
- Namesake: Ogier the Dane
- Owner: Henning H. Faddersbøll
- Acquired: 1986
- Decommissioned: 1980s
- Home port: Copenhagen, Denmark
- Identification: IMO: 7724239
- Fate: Sold to Brazilian Navy in 1988.

History

Brazil
- Name: NSS Felinto Perry
- Owner: Brazilian Navy
- Acquired: 1988
- Commissioned: 19 October 1988
- Decommissioned: 14 December 2020
- Identification: MMSI number: 710443000; Callsign: PWFR; Pennant number: K-11
- Motto: Mergulhe tranquilo, estamos atentos ("Dive easy, we're keeping an eye out")
- Nickname(s): Ás de Copas ("Ace of Hearts")

General characteristics
- Class & type: DnV +1A1 E0 DSV Tug Supply Vessel Fire Fighter.
- Displacement: 4,107 tons
- Length: 77.8 m (255 ft 3 in)
- Propulsion: 2 × Bergen Mek Verksteder KVGB 12 12-cylinder diesel engines 2 × Bergen Mek Verksteder KVGB 16 16-cylinder diesel engines 2 × Daimler-Benz OM 414 diesel engines 2 × 1,712kW emergency generator
- Speed: 14.5 knots (26.9 km/h; 16.7 mph)
- Range: 7,500 nmi (13,900 km; 8,600 mi)
- Endurance: 70 days
- Boats & landing craft carried: 1 × Submarine Rescue Vehicle 1 × Submarine Support and Rescue Vessel
- Complement: 65 crews
- Sensors & processing systems: 2 × Raytheon navigation radars.
- Aviation facilities: Helicopter landing platform

MS Wildrake/Holger Danske/NSS Felinto Perry was a motor diving vessel built in Norway and used by the Norwegian company K/S Wilhelmsen Marine Services A/S. She was renamed Holger Dane after being sold to Denmark and finally NSS Felinto Perry (K-11) in the Brazilian Navy as a submarine relief ship from the Brazilian Navy. It was equipped to support diving, fire fighting and rescue of submarines.

== Service in Norway ==
=== 1970s ===
The MS Wildrake was a diving support vessel constructed for and owned by Anders Wilhelmsen AS, a Norwegian shipping company. It had a built-in saturation diving system designed and built by another Norwegian company, Møllerodden AS. In May 1979, Infabco began negotiations for exclusive rights to the Wildrake. In June and early July, with the Wildrake moored near Ulsteinvik, Infabco personnel prepared its diving system for use. The system was certified by Det Norske Veritas (DNV) on 3 July 1979. In mid-July, 17 bell runs were conducted from the Wildrake to prepare the SALM base for the reattachment.

==== Wildrake Diving Accident ====
The Wildrake diving accident was an incident in Scotland in August 1979 that killed two American commercial divers. During a routine dive in the East Shetland Basin of the North Sea, the diving bell of the diving support vessel MS Wildrake became separated from its main lift wire at a depth of over 160 metres (520 ft). Although the bell was eventually recovered by Wildrake, its two occupants, 32-year-old Richard Arthur Walker and 28-year-old Victor Francis "Skip" Guiel Jr., died of hypothermia. The accident resulted in extensive subsequent litigation and led to important safety changes in the diving industry.

== Service in Denmark ==
MS Wildrake was renamed Holger Dane and was sold to Henning H. Faddersbøll in 1986. She was based in Copenhagen, Denmark. The Holger Dane was famous for the treasure hunt promoted by Henning H. Fadderbøll in the English Channel, where the hull of the English ship “Medina” was found full of Indian works of art. She was sold to the Brazilian Navy after nearly 2 years of service.

== Service in Brazilian Navy ==
=== 1980s ===
In 1988, she was acquired by the Brazilian Navy from the Norwegian company A / S Sentinel Offshore to replace the ship NSS Gastão Moutinho (K-10) in the tasks of rescuing personnel, saving material and supporting deep diving.

The Holger Dane was famous for the treasure hunt promoted by Henning H. Fadderbøll in the English Channel, where the hull of the English ship “Medina” was found full of Indian works of art. Incorporated into the Brazilian Armada on October 19, 1988, he was named in honor of Admiral Felinto Perry, an officer with active participation in the organization of the Submarine Force, of which he was its first commander.

It is affectionately called by its crew as "Ace of Hearts".

=== 1990s ===
In the first week of July 1991, he rescued the Vessel and Material Disembarkation Vessel, number 305 (EDVM-305), with 25 tons of displacement, which had been wrecked, during exercises, 330 meters from Itaóca Beach, in Espírito Santo. Anchoring at four irons on the EDVM, after 12 hours of intense work by divers and the entire crew, the vessel was moved by the towing cable and brought to the surface by the ship's crane. Using portable pumps, the EDVM compartments were depleted and the vessel was placed at the stern of the ship. On their return to Rio de Janeiro, Felinto Perry delivered the vessel to the Landing Vessel Group for repairs.

==== Operation TORPEDEX II ====
On August 18, it provided support for the actual test of the MFC-01/100 Anchorage and Contact Mine, which took place off Rio de Janeiro. Between August 30 and September 2, he was in Santos-SP, during the interval of underwater rescue exercises with S Bahia (G-40). Between October 22 and 24, he participated in Operation TORPEDEX II, to evaluate the launch of the torpedo, together with the S Tupi (S-30) and the F União (F-45). Between November 22 and 25, he was in Santos-SP during the interval of Underwater Rescue exercises with S Humaitá (S-20). This was Felinto Perry's 7th stopover in the port of São Paulo.

Between December 12 and 16, he was in Santos together with the S Amazonas (S-16) and Humaitá (S-20), during the interval of Submarine Rescue exercises. The Amazonas entered and left the same day after refueling remaining in the bar.

On July 14, 1994, she received the "Contact" Award, granted by COMCONTRAM.

On April 26, 1995, at anchor in a cove to the north of Ilha Grande, it served as a target in an exercise when a MEC Group, which had been collected on the high seas by S Humaitá (S-20), after being launched by parachute of a C-115 Bufalo aircraft of the 1st GTT carried out a simulated attack. Between April 28 and May 1, he was at the port of Santos.

On April 9, 1996, she suspended from Rio de Janeiro for the refueling commission of the POIT - Oceanographic Post of the Island of Trindade.

On June 25, 1998, Felinto Perry received from the Command of Naval Control of Maritime Traffic - COMCONTRAM, the "Contact-CNTM / Squadron" Award, for the year 1997. On October 3, he completed 10 years of service to the Brazilian Navy, having reached the mark of 740 days at sea and 86,000 miles sailed.

=== 2000s ===
In March, 2000, she was submitted to an Aviation Safety inspection by the Navy Aviation Investigation and Prevention Service (SIPAAerM).

==== Operation SARSUB-I / 03 ====
Between 29 June and 3 July 2003, she participated, in the Angra dos Reis area, in Operation SARSUB-I / 03, carried out by ForS in conjunction with S Tupi (S-30) and AvApCo Almirante Hess (BACS-01), and told, also, with the participation of divers from BACS and CIAMA. This operation took on historical characteristics, since for the first time in our Navy the Submarine Rescue Bell (SRS) was coupled with the opening of the lower and upper hatches of the Tupi battery compartment, where a "doll" was transferred for the SRS. The port of Santos-SP was visited.

At the end of June, 2004, she performed rescue exercises in conjunction with the S Tupi (S-30) and the AvApCos Almirante Hess (BACS-01). She visited the port of Santos-SP from 17 to 20 September. Between December 10 and 14, during the interval of diving exercises carried out on the north coast of São Paulo, he was visiting the port of Santos-SP, together with AvApCos Almirante Hess (BACS-01). On that occasion he participated in the celebrations of the Sailor's Day.

Felinto Perry carried out a General Maintenance Period (PMG), restarting diving training in sequence, preparing for the Efficiency Check, in the requalification of the ship and its crew in carrying out submarine rescue operations in 2005.

==== Operation TROPICALEX-I / 06 ====
On January 25, it was submitted to VSA by SIPAA-ForSup (Surface Force Command Accident Prevention Investigation Section). Participated in Operation TROPICALEX-I / 06, carried out from May 1 to June 1 along the coast of the Northeast and Southeast regions, integrating Task Group 705.1 composed of F Bosisio (F-48), Greenhalgh (F-46), Rademaker (F-49), Niterói (F-40) and Independência (F-44); Cv Jaceguai (V-31) and Frontin (V-33); CT Pará (D-27); NT Marajó (G-27) and Almirante Gastão Motta (G-23); NDD Rio de Janeiro (G-31); NDCC Mattoso Maia (G-28) and the submarines Tamoio and Tapajó. The operation also had the participation of the following district ships: RbAM Tridente (R-22) and NPa Gurupi (P-47) of the 1st DN; Cv Caboclo (V-19), NPa Guaratuba (P-50) and Gravataí (P-51) and NV Atalaia (M-17), Araçatuba (M-18), Abrolhos (M-19) and Albardão (M-20), of the 2nd DN and the RbAM Trindade (R-26) and the NPa Grajaú (P-40), Goiana (P-43) and Graúna (P-42) of the 3rd DN. Aircraft from ForAerNav and FAB also participated.

==== Operation ADEREX-II / 06 ====
Between July 31 and August 17, participated in Operation ADEREX-II / 06, which took place in the maritime area between São Paulo and Espírito Santo, integrating Task Group also composed of F Niterói (F-40), Constitution (F-42), Independência (F-44), Rademaker (F-49), CT Pará (D-27), Cv Frontin (V-33) and S Tapajó (S-33). The commission was accompanied by the Commander-in-Chief of the Squadron, Vice Admiral Álvaro Luiz Pinto, the Chief of Staff of the Squadron, Rear Admiral João Arthur do Carmo Hildebrandt, Commander of the 1st Division of the Squadron, Rear Admiral Francisco Antônio de Magalhães Laranjeira and Commander of the 2nd Division of the Squadron, Rear Admiral Rodrigo Otávio Fernandes de Hônkis, also Commander of the Task Group.

==== Operation SARSUB-II / 2008 ====
From March 24 to 28, he participated in Operation SARSUB-II / 2008, held in the Bay of Ilha Grande, in Angra dos Reis, and which also included the participation of S Tupi (S-31) and AvApCos Almirante Hess (BACS-01). The operation consisted of a simulation of the rescue of an injured submarine, with high-pressure air passage exercises, material passage and collection and medical assistance for the crew members who escaped through the rescue box.

==== SARSUB-TIKUNA 2009 ====
Between February 9 and 12, the SARSUB-TIKUNA 2009 commission was held in Angra dos Reis, together with the NSS Felinto Perry. On the 12th, under the coordination of the Submarine Force Command (ComForS), the rescue of four Tikuna crew, two of whom are observer officers of the North American Navy and the Chilean Navy. In this exercise, after opening the hatch, a doctor went into the submarine and four crew members went to the rescue bell. Then, the crew members were brought to the surface and disembarked at Felinto Perry, where they passed, simultaneously, to the care of the team of hyperbaric doctors and nurses. This was the first time that Felinto Perry made the coupling of his rescue bell in Tikuna, after having done it in all submarines of the "Tupi" Class.

=== 2010s ===
On August 25, she was visited by Rear Admiral Khawaja Ghazanfar Hussain, Director of Operational Plans for the Pakistani Navy, accompanied by an entourage also formed by Commodore Asif Khaliq, Captain-de-Mar-e-Guerra Zain Zulfiqar and Brigadier Mazahar Hussain, Naval Attaché of Pakistan.

==== Operation ANTARTICA XXXI ====
In 2012, Felinto Perry in Operation ANTARTICA XXXI, which started on October 6, together with NOc Almirante Maximiano (H-41) and NApOc Ary Rongel (H-44), and which also had the support of the merchant ship "MV Germania" and the Transport Ship of Personnel and Cargo of the Armada Argentina ARA Bahia de San Blas (B-4). In this commission Felinto Perry was employed in tasks of logistical support to the dismantling services of the Antarctic Comandante Ferraz Station, and also, in tasks related to the installation of emergency Antarctic modules, carrying out fieldwork in refuges and camps, and as a platform for conducting research.

On April 8, 2013, she arrived in Rio Grande, returning from Antartica.

=== Decommissioned ===
The "Ace of Hearts" was decommissioned in 14 December 2020, in an event that saw her flag be delivered to the CO of NSS Guillobel. During her 32-year tenure with the Brazilian Navy, Felinto Perry reached the milestone of 1,797 days at sea and sailed 189,483 nautical miles.

== Equipments ==
The vessel is equipped with decompression chambers, an atmospheric bell (allows rescues to be carried out at depths greater than 300 meters), whaling with a hyperbaric chamber and an unmanned vehicle remotely controlled for operations up to 600 meters ("ROV" ). It also has a dynamic positioning system ("DPS", which allows the ship to remain stationary in relation to a certain point), a platform for helicopters and cranes.

== Gallery ==
MS Wildrake, Holger Dane & NSS Felinto Perry Gallery

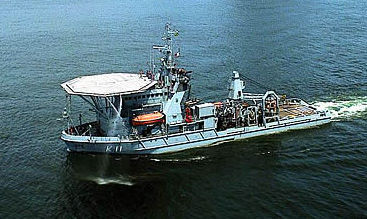
NSS Felinto Perry in 2009.

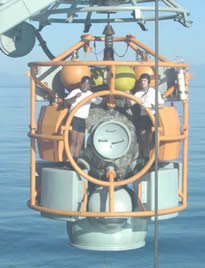
One of NSS Felinto Perry’s ROVs in 2009.

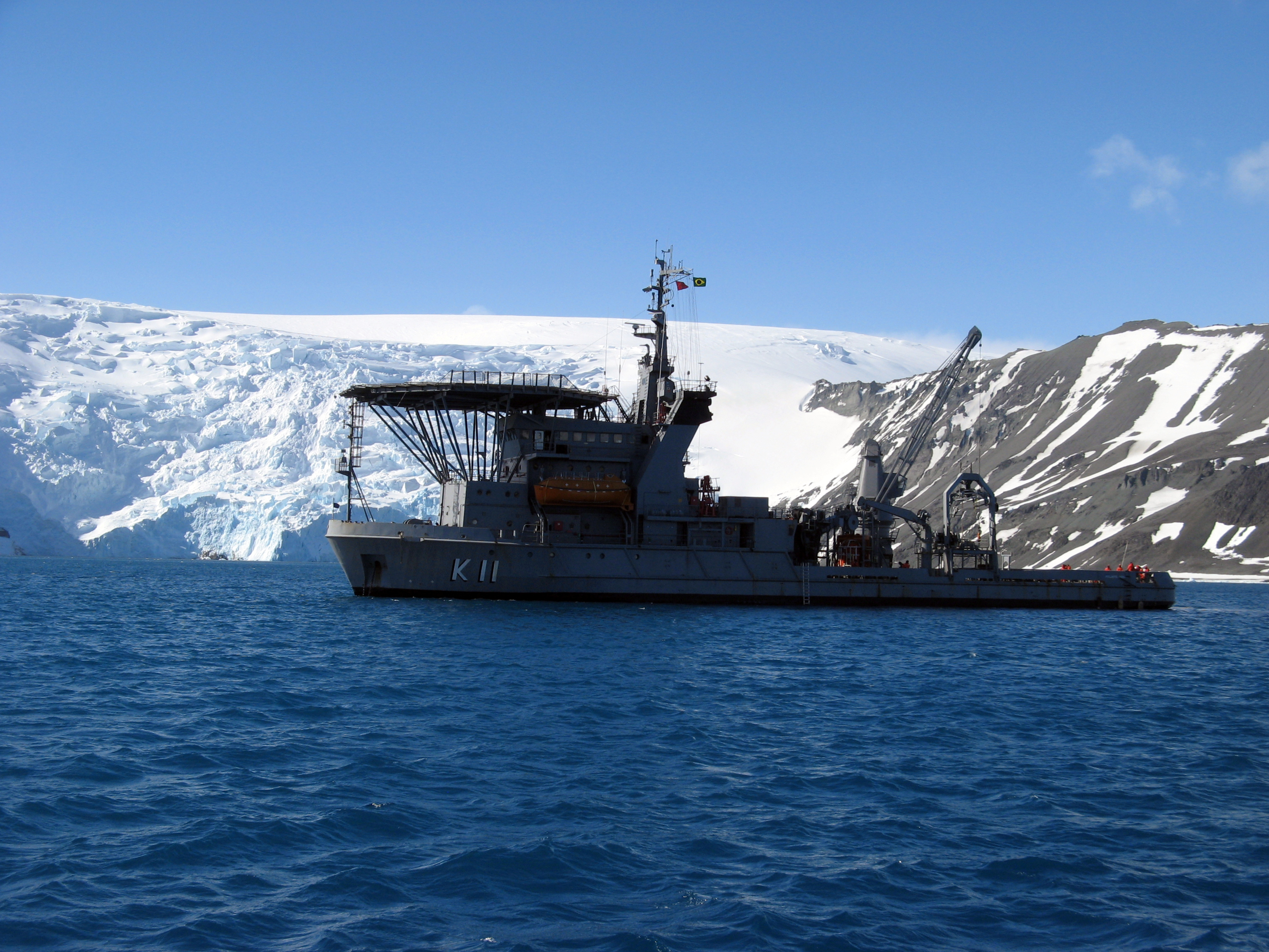
NSS Flinto Perry underway on 15 May 2012.

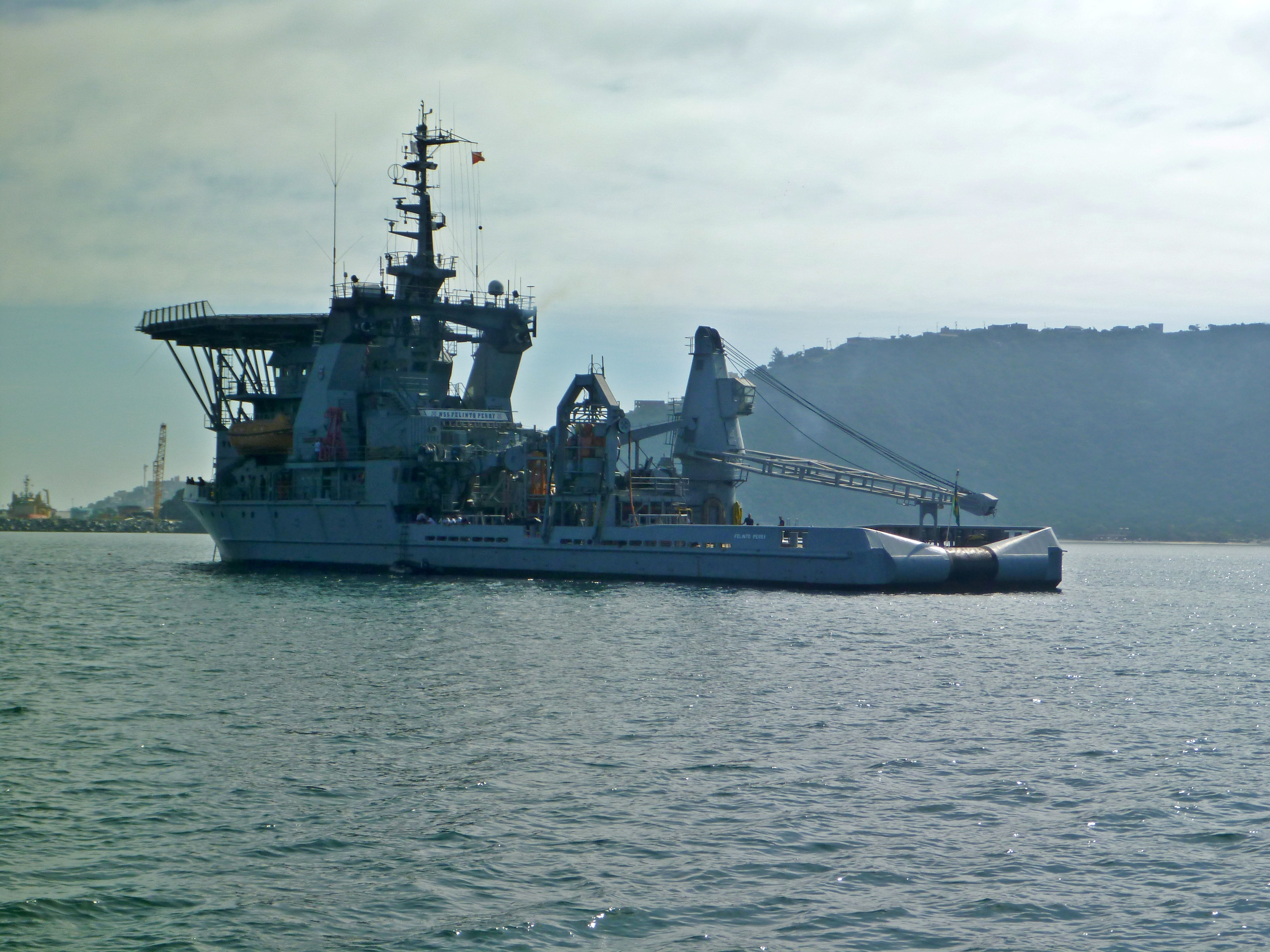
NSS Felinto Perry at the coast off Arraial do Carbo on 26 May 2015.

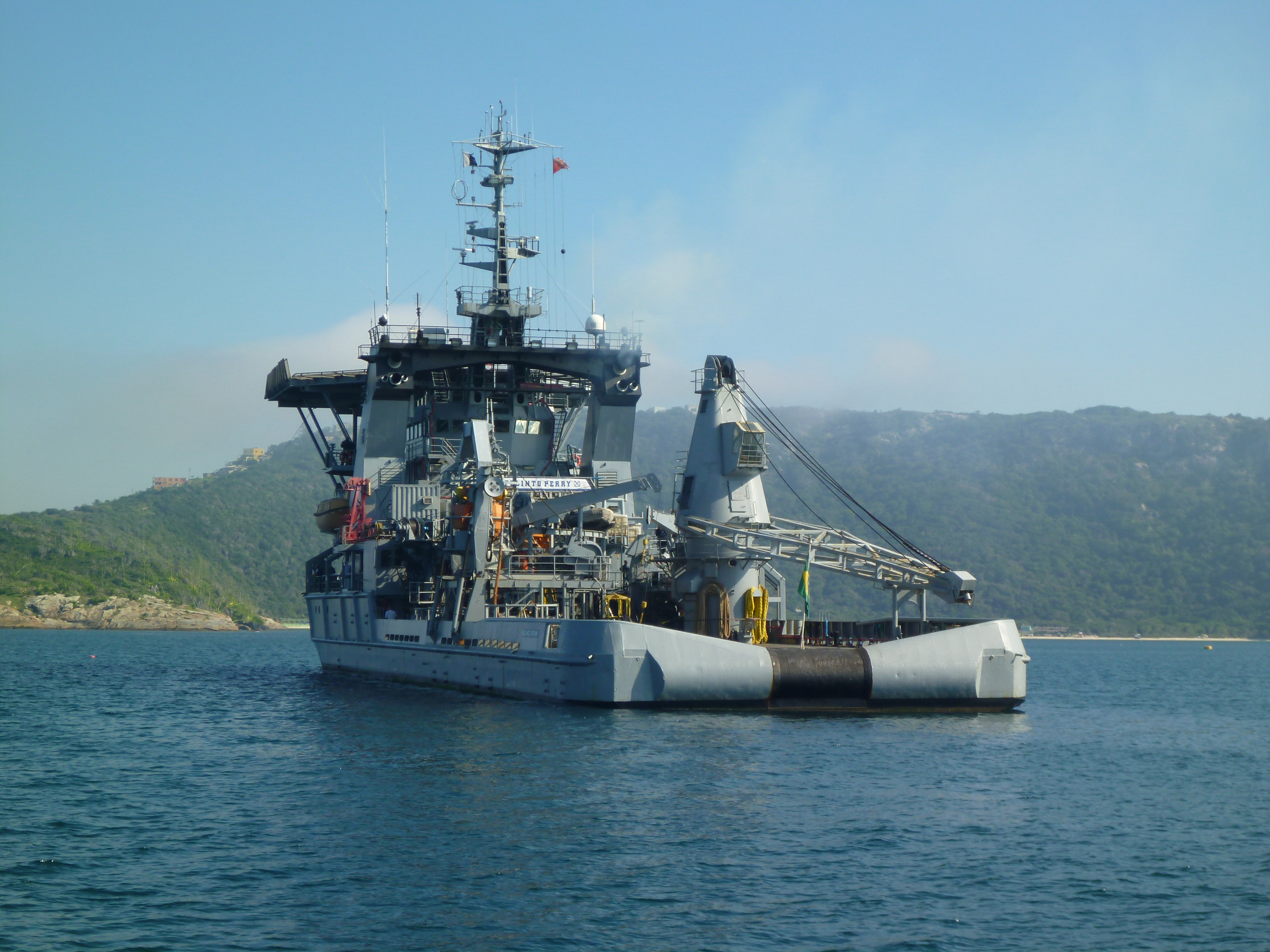
NSS Felinto Perry at the coast off Arraial do Carbo on 26 May 2015.

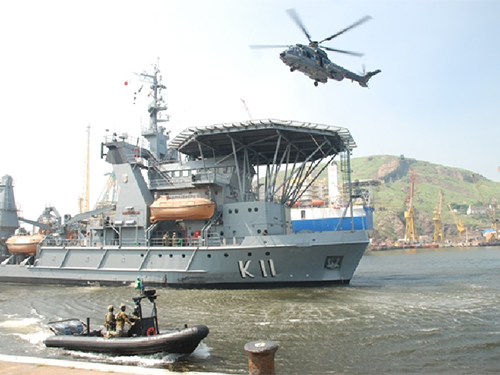
A helicopter coming into NSS Felinto Perry’s helipad on 4 April 2016.
