= G27 =

G27 may refer to:

- Brazilian tanker Marajó, a tanker of the Brazilian Navy
- Gribovsky G-27, a Soviet aircraft
- Glock 27, an Austrian pistol
- Logitech G27, a racing wheel
- Heckler & Koch G27, a German battle rifle
- HMS Leeds (G27), a Caldwell-class destroyer of the Royal Navy
