= Brazilian cruiser Imperial Marinheiro =

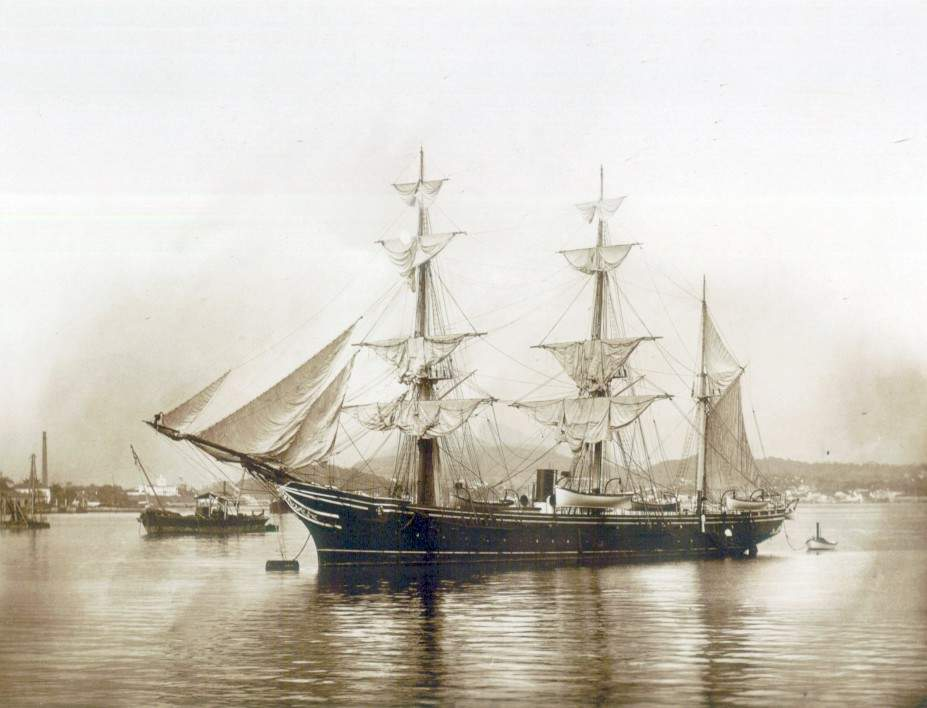
- Imperial Marinheiro, picture by Marc Ferrez

History

Empire of Brazil
- Name: Imperial Marinheiro
- Namesake: Brazilian sailors
- Ordered: Empire of Brazil
- Builder: Ponta da Areia Shipyard
- Laid down: 11 August 1882
- Launched: 20 June 1883
- Commissioned: 26 November 1884
- Decommissioned: 7 September 1887
- Fate: Sunk

General characteristics
- Class & type: Cruiser
- Displacement: 726 tons
- Length: 65.12 m (213 ft 8 in)
- Beam: 8.46 m (27 ft 9 in)
- Draft: 3.35 m (11.0 ft)
- Installed power: 750 hp
- Propulsion: Mixed steam-sail
- Sail plan: Galley-rigged
- Speed: 10 knots (19 km/h; 12 mph)
- Complement: 142
- Armament: 7 × 1 – 32 cal. guns; 4 × 1 – Machine guns

Imperial Marinheiro was a cruiser operated by the Imperial Brazilian Navy between 1884 and 1887. It was the second Brazilian ship to bear this name, a tribute to the country's sailors. It sank in 1887, near the mouth of the Doce River, in Espírito Santo.

== Characteristics ==
Imperial Marinheiro had a displacement of 726 tons. A total length of 65.12 meters and a distance between perpendiculars of 50.63 meters. Its beam of 8.46 meters and depth of 4.27 meters contributed to its stability and ability to carry a considerable crew and armament. The forward draft of 3.05 meters and aft draft of 3.35 meters were specifications that made the cruiser suitable for a variety of missions and sea conditions.

Imperial Marinheiro was the second Brazilian ship to bear this name, which is a tribute to Brazil's sailors. The first ship of the Brazilian Navy to bear this name was a wooden vessel with sail propulsion, with a displacement of 623 tons. This ship was built at the Rio de Janeiro Navy Arsenal, under the plans and supervision of naval engineer Napoleão J. B. Level. Its journey began on 27 August 1851, when it was solemnly launched into the sea and classified as a corvette.

The cruiser had a triple expansion steam engine, which produced a total power of 750 hp. This power allowed the ship to reach a maximum speed of 10 knots, in addition to a single smokestack and a propeller. In terms of armament, the vessel had seven 32 caliber cannons. Furthermore, the presence of four machine guns further reinforced its firepower. Its crew consisted of 142 officers and enlisted men.

== Construction ==
The ship, of mixed construction, made of wood and iron, with a hybrid propulsion, combining sail and steam, was built at the Foundry Establishment and Shipyards of Ponta d'Areia, located in Niterói, Rio de Janeiro. This naval project was supervised by first lieutenant João Cândido Brazil, an experienced engineer who played a key role in its design and construction.

The keel was laid on 11 August 1882, marking the beginning of its construction. The process culminated with its launch into the sea on 20 June 1883. It was commissioned on 26 November 1884, when the vessel's armament display was held, an event that symbolized the maturity and readiness of the vessel for the tasks that awaited it. That day, it received the number 17 badge, becoming part of the Imperial Brazilian Navy.

== History ==
The ship began its service under the command of lieutenant captain José Bitor de Lamare, who led the crew in their missions and responsibilities from an unspecified year onwards. In 1885, the cruiser saw a transition of command with the appointment of lieutenant captain João Carlos Pereira Pinto as its new commander.

=== Shipwreck ===
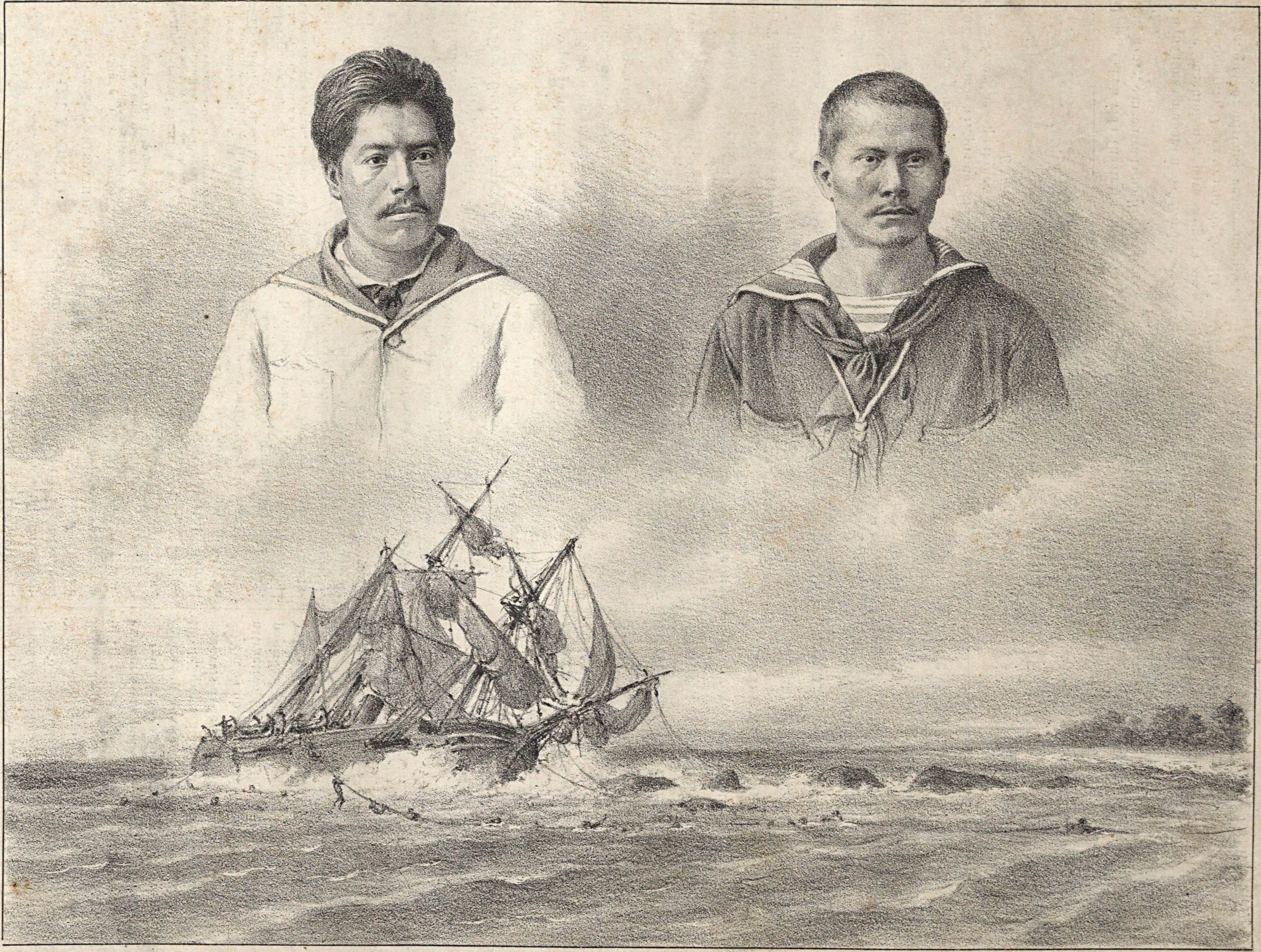
The shipwreck of the Imperial Marinheiro and the heroic fishermen Bernardo and Antonio Pedro, who distinguished themselves so much in saving lives (Revista Illustrada, 1887).

On 5 September 1887, Imperial Marinheiro departed Rio de Janeiro on a mission commissioned by the Hydrographic Department. The objective was to probe the Marajó bank, located in Abrolhos, in response to requests from France. These requests were motivated by reports of French packet boats touching areas at risk to navigation in that region.

In the early hours of 7 September, the ship sank two miles from the mouth of the Doce River, near Regência Augusta, in Espírito Santo. A longboat with 12 crew members was launched into the sea in search of help. They looked for the skipper of Barra do Rio Doce, José da Rocha de Oliveira Pinto, who went to the scene of the accident with rescue equipment. However, due to the darkness, they could do nothing to help. As daylight arrived, the wreckage of the ship scattered across the beach, and several survivors were clinging to it. For five hours, a battle against the raging sea raged, resulting in the rescue of the remaining survivors via a cable strung by fisherman Bernardo José dos Santos between the beach and the wrecked hull on the rocks.

Bernardo José dos Santos, known as Caboclo Bernardo, and other people involved in the rescue managed to save hundreds of men, including several notable officers who would later stand out in the navy, such as Índio do Brasil, Francisco de Matos, Calheiros da Graça and others. Bernardo swam to the sunken ship and managed to establish a connection with the coast, thus enabling the rescue of many castaways. His contribution was recognized and applauded. However, the tragedy also had its human cost, with the loss of 14 lives. The cause of the sinking was the subject of various speculations, with hypotheses that included compass variation, calculation or observation errors. In his defense, commander Pereira Pinto claimed that the accident occurred due to the strong current, an explanation that raised doubts and debates about the circumstances that led to the sinking of the ship.

By sentence of the Supreme Military Council of Justice, dated 10 December 1887, lieutenant captain João Carlos da Fonseca Pereira Pinto, who was the former commander of the ship at the time of the sinking, was sentenced to two years of suspension of command. Second lieutenant Alfredo de Azevedo Alves, who was also an officer on the cruiser and was in charge of navigation, received a six-month prison sentence. On the other hand, second lieutenant Alípio Mursa was acquitted. In addition to the legal consequences, there were gestures of recognition and gratitude for those who played a role in saving the victims. Fisherman Bernardo José dos Santos, in particular, was received with warm celebrations in Vitória and Rio de Janeiro, and the Imperial Government decorated him with a humanitarian medal. Other individuals, such as Faustino José Pedro, João Roque da Silva and Manuel Francisco da Silva, also received awards from the government in recognition of their services in rescuing the sailors.

The fatal victims were: second lieutenant Trifeno de Oliveira, midshipman Francisco de Paula Mello Alves, third engineer Américo Brasílio da Silva, fourth engineer Ildefonso Machado Dutra, as well as machine operators such as Francisco Dias Braga and Frederico Cândido de Andrade. The sailors Francisco Segundo, Roque Lúcio, Américo Soares Lobo, Pedro Felício, Inácio Pereira, as well as the hired stoker Francisco Xavier Estevão and the cabin boys Agostinho and José Alves Ferreira also lost their lives in the tragedy. 117 people managed to survive. Among the survivors, 92 were soldiers from the Imperial Sailor Corps.

== See also ==
- List of historical ships of the Brazilian Navy
