= Brazilian submarine rescue ship Guillobel =

Brazilian navy submarine rescue ship

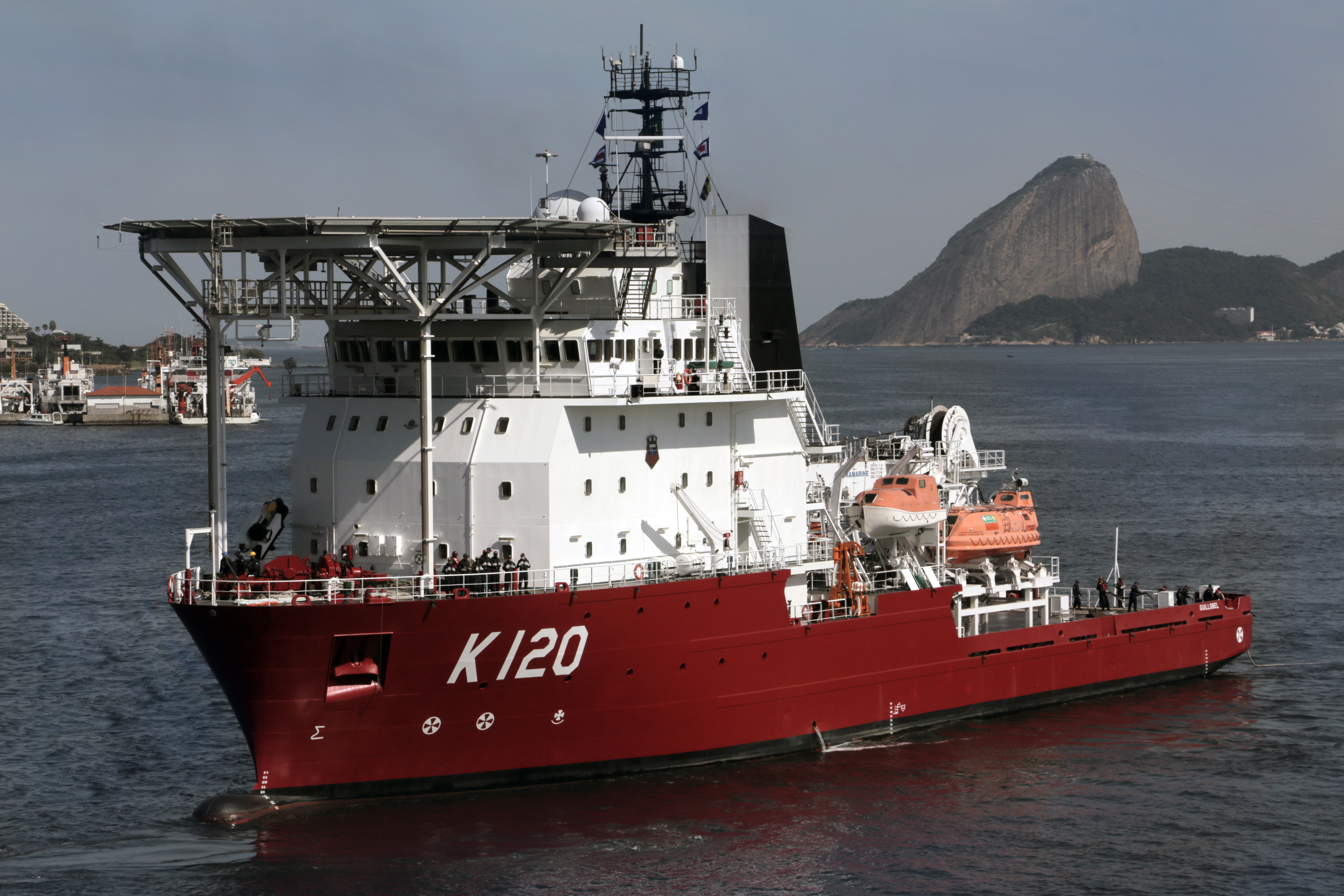
- NSS Guillobel

History

Brazil
- Name: Guillobel
- Namesake: Admiral Renato de Almeida Guillobel
- Operator: Brazilian Navy
- Builder: Astilleros Balenciaga, Zumaia, Spain
- Launched: 2009
- Commissioned: 12 May 2020
- Home port: Niterói
- Identification: MMSI number: 710510000; Callsign: PWGL; Pennant number: K120
- Status: in active service

General characteristics
- Displacement: 5,700 tons
- Length: 85 m (278 ft 10 in)
- Beam: 18 m (59 ft 1 in)
- Draught: 5.7 m (18 ft 8 in)

NSS Guillobel (K120) is a submarine rescue ship of the Brazilian Navy. She was launched in 2009 as DSV Adams Challenge and was operated by the company ADAMS Offshore until acquired by the Brazilian Navy as a replacement for the aging submarine rescue ship NSS Felinto Perry (K-11).

She is the second Brazilian Navy ship to be named after Admiral Renato de Almeida Guillobel, a Brazilian Navy officer who fought in both World Wars and acted as Minister of the Navy from 1951 to 1954.
