= Albert David =

United States Navy Medal of Honor recipient

Albert Leroy David
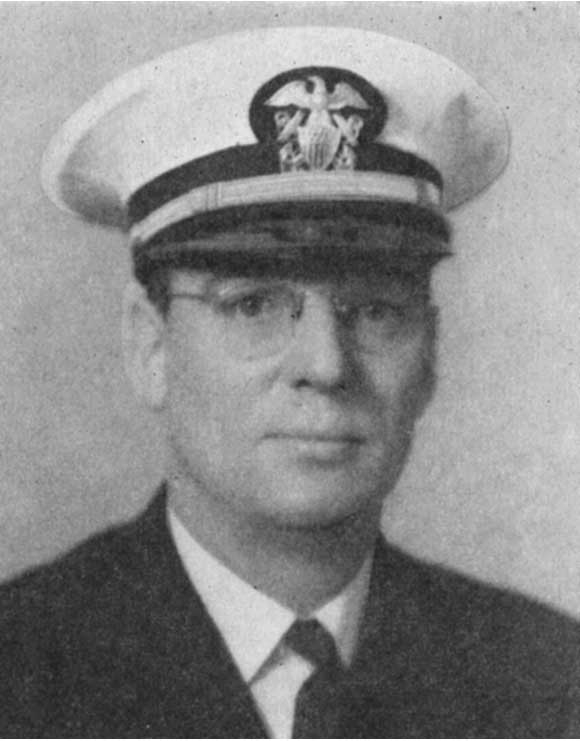
- Born: July 18, 1902; Maryville, Missouri
- Died: September 17, 1945 (aged 43); Norfolk, Virginia
- Burial place: Fort Rosecrans National Cemetery, San Diego, California
- Military career
- Allegiance: United States of America
- Branch: United States Navy
- Service years: 1919–1945
- Rank: Lieutenant
- Units: USS Pillsbury
- Conflicts: World War II
- Awards: Medal of Honor; Navy Cross (2)

Albert Leroy David (July 18, 1902 – September 17, 1945) was an officer in the United States Navy during World War II and a recipient of two Navy Crosses as well as the Medal of Honor. He was awarded the Medal of Honor for his role in helping to capture the German submarine U-505, off the coast of French West Africa in June 1944.

== Early life and career ==
Born in Maryville, Missouri, David enlisted in the Navy at Kansas City, Missouri, on September 30, 1919. After undergoing his training at the Naval Training Station, San Francisco, he served on the battleship USS Arkansas (BB-33) for the rest of his first enlistment.

Reenlisting at Omaha, Nebraska, on July 19, 1921, David served his second enlistment in a succession of ships: USS New York (ACR-2), USS Preston (DD-327), USS Delaware (BB-28), USS Utah (BB-31), and USS Texas (BB-35), reenlisting on board Texas on May 12, 1925. He then served in USS Trenton (CL-11), USS Cincinnati (CL-6), and USS Salt Lake City (CA-25), reenlisting at Philadelphia, Pennsylvania, on June 15, 1931. He reported on board USS Dobbin (AD-3) on July 3, 1931, and served in that destroyer tender until his transfer to the Fleet Reserve on August 10, 1939.

== World War II ==
David was recalled to active duty, though, on September 27, 1939, less than a month after World War II broke out in Europe with Nazi Germany's invasion of Poland.

Appointed machinist on May 13, 1942, David was assigned to the Submarine Repair Unit, San Diego on May 28, and served in that unit for five months. While there, he received his promotion to ensign on June 15. Reporting thence to the Naval Training School for diesel engineers at the Madison campus of the University of Wisconsin, for instruction, David ultimately reported for duty at the Naval Training Station, Naval Operating Base, Norfolk, before he traveled to Orange, Texas, to assist in fitting out the destroyer escort USS Pillsbury (DE-133), which was commissioned at the Consolidated Steel Corporation yard on June 7, 1943.

Promoted to lieutenant (jg.) while Pillsbury was fitting out, David served in that ship as she operated in the Atlantic, escorting convoys into Casablanca and Gibraltar, and serving with a "hunter-killer" unit formed around USS Guadalcanal (CVE-60). He was serving as Pillsbury's assistant engineering and electrical officer when Guadalcanal's task group located a German submarine off Cape Blanco, French West Africa, on June 4, 1944, and forced it to the surface.

Pillsbury lowered a boat and sent a party of nine men, led by David, to board the U-boat, soon identified as U-505, which was still underway and running in a circle on the surface. Although he "had every reason to believe" that Germans were still below decks setting demolition charges and scuttling the ship, David led Pillsbury's men on board and down the conning tower hatch, and took possession of the boat. Although he found the sea flooding into the U-boat, David remained below directing the initial salvage operations—aware that at any moment the submersible could blow up or sink. Men from Guadalcanal arrived soon thereafter to aid in the battle to keep U-505 afloat, and David remained on board directing the salvage operations. As a result of his vigorous and heroic efforts, the valuable prize was eventually taken to Bermuda.

Promoted to lieutenant soon thereafter, David received the Medal of Honor for his part in the "first successful boarding and capture of an enemy man-of-war on the high seas by the United States Navy since 1815." His was the only Medal of Honor awarded to a member of the Navy in the Atlantic theater of World War II.

He died of a heart attack at Norfolk, Virginia, however, before the medal could be presented to him; it was presented by President Harry S. Truman to David's widow, Lynda Mae David, on October 5, 1945, in a ceremony at the White House.

== Awards ==

- Medal of Honor
- Navy Cross with gold star
- Good Conduct Medal
- American Defense Service Medal
- European-African-Middle Eastern Campaign Medal
- World War II Victory Medal

=== Medal of Honor citation ===
His Medal of Honor citation reads:

For conspicuous gallantry and intrepidity at the risk of his life above and beyond the call of duty while attached to the U.S.S. Pillsbury during the capture of an enemy German submarine off French West Africa, June 4, 1944. Taking a vigorous part in the skillfully coordinated attack on the U-505 at the end of a prolonged search by the Task Group, Lt. (then Lt. j.g.) David boldly led a party from the Pillsbury in boarding the hostile submarine as it circled erratically at 5 or 6 knots on the surface. Fully aware that the U-boat might at any moment sink or be blown up by exploding demolition and scuttling charges, he braved the added danger of enemy gunfire to plunge through the conning tower hatch and, with his small party, exerted every effort to keep the ship afloat and to assist the succeeding and more fully equipped salvage parties in making the U-505 seaworthy for the long tow across the Atlantic to a U.S. port. By his valiant service during the first successful boarding and capture of an enemy man-of-war on the high seas by the United States Navy since 1815, Lt. David contributed materially to the effectiveness of the Battle of the Atlantic and upheld the highest traditions of the U.S. Naval Service.

== See also ==
- USS Albert David (FF-1050), Destroyer escort, later a frigate, named after him.
- List of Medal of Honor recipients for World War II
