= Portuguese ship Nossa Senhora da Conceição (1771) =

Ship of the line of the Portuguese Navy (1771–1830)

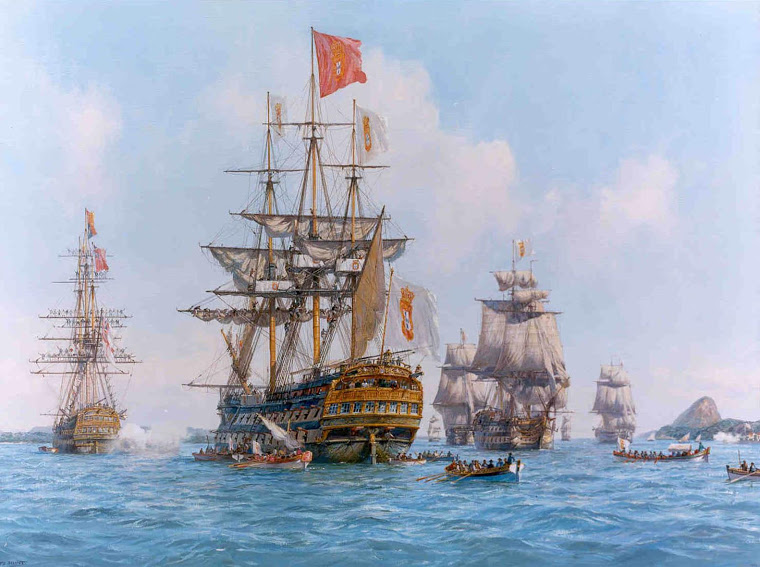
- Painting of Príncipe Real (centre) arriving in Guanabara Bay in 1808 by Geoff Hunt

History

Kingdom of Portugal
- Name: Nossa Senhora da Conceição
- Namesake: Immaculate Conception
- Owner: Kingdom of Portugal
- Builder: Arsenal Real da Marinha
- Launched: 13 July 1771
- Renamed: to Príncipe Real in 1794

U.K. of Portugal, Brazil and the Algarves
- Name: Príncipe Real
- Namesake: Prince Royal of Portugal

Empire of Brazil
- Name: Príncipe Real
- Decommissioned: 1830
- Fate: Scrapped

General characteristics
- Type: Ship of the line
- Length: 67 m (219 ft 10 in)
- Beam: 16.5 m (54 ft 2 in)
- Depth: 12 m (39 ft 4 in)
- Armament: 90 cannons

Nossa Senhora da Conceição was a 90-gun first-rate ship of the line of the Portuguese Navy which was launched at Lisbon on 13 July 1771. In 1793, she was the flagship of a Portuguese squadron dispatched to assist the Royal Navy's Channel Fleet. She was refitted and renamed Príncipe Real in 1794, and from 1798 to 1800 served in the Mediterranean Sea as the flagship of a Portuguese squadron which saw service alongside British Admiral Horatio Nelson.

In mid-September 1798, a squadron of Portuguese ships arrived at French-occupied Malta to assist a British siege. The squadron included Príncipe Real (90; Captain Puysigur), Rainha de Portugal (74; Captain Thomas Stone), São Sebastião (74; Captain Mitchell), Afonso de Albuquerque (64; Captain Donald Campbell), and the brig Falcão (24; Captain Duncan). Four of the captains were British, and all were under the command of Domingos Xavier de Lima, Marquess of Niza. In addition, the British ship HMS Lion (Captain Manley Dixon) and the fireship HMS Incendiary (Captain George Baker) were attached to the squadron. The Portuguese government had sent this force from the Tagus to augment Nelson's fleet. After a brief stay off Malta the squadron continued to Alexandria. There Nelson sent the squadron back to blockade Malta.

HMS Foudroyant departed Naples on 6 August 1799, in company with the frigate Syren, and Príncipe Real. Foudroyant also transported the Sardinian royal family to Leghorn on 22 September.

On 18 October 1800, an Anglo-Portuguese squadron shared in the capture of the Ragusan polacca Madonna Della Gratia e San Gaetano, which was carrying plate, amongst other cargo. The British vessels were Alexander, Terpsichore, Bonne Citoyenne and Incendiary, and the Portuguese vessels Príncipe Real, Rainha de Portugal, Afonso de Albuquerque, and the corvette Benjamin.

During the transfer of the Portuguese Court to Brazil in 1807-08, Príncipe Real was the flagship of the Portuguese flotilla.

== Fate ==
Príncipe Real remained in Brazil after Brazil achieved its independence in 1822.

== See also ==
- List of historical ships of the Brazilian Navy
