= Brazilian gunboat Iniciadora =

Brazilian gunboat operated by the Imperial Brazilian Navy, after Brazilian Navy (1889)

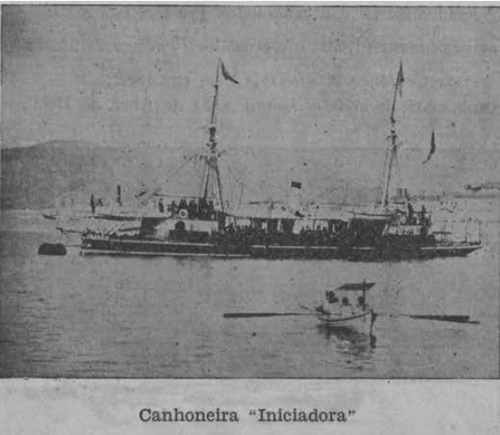
- Iniciadora

History

(Empire of Brazil) Brazil
- Name: Iniciadora
- Operator: Imperial Brazilian Navy
- Builder: Arsenal de Marinha do Rio de Janeiro
- Launched: April 1, 1883
- Commissioned: May 12, 1885
- Decommissioned: June 26, 1907

General characteristics
- Type: Gunboat
- Displacement: 270 t (270,000 kg)
- Length: 122 ft (37 m)
- Beam: 25.9 ft (7.9 m)
- Draft: 5.41 ft (1.65 m)
- Depth: 2,44 m (8,01 ft)
- Installed power: 260 hp (191 kW)
- Propulsion: Compound steam engine, driving two propellers
- Speed: 9 knot (16.66 km/h)
- Crew: 51
- Armament: 2 Armstrong 120 mm rotary cannons, one forward and one aft; 2 Nordenfelt 37 mm cannons; 2 Nordenfelt 25 mm machine guns; 4 machine guns

Iniciadora was a gunboat operated by the Imperial Brazilian Navy, later the Brazilian Navy after 1889. The gunboat was the first Brazilian experiment in building iron-hulled warships. The design, by naval engineer João Cândido Brazil, was based on the plans for the British gunboats HMS Medina and HMS Medway. After her incorporation in 1885, she was sent to the Mato Grosso Flotilla. In February 1892, she was initially involved in the separatist insurrection in the state of Mato Grosso on the rebels' side, but the crew surrendered to the loyalists in May of the same year. She was retired in 1907.

== Construction ==
The construction of the gunboat Iniciadora was the result of a project by the administration of Navy Minister José Rodrigues de Lima Duarte (1880-1882) to develop warships made entirely of steel and iron. The aim was to build five gunboats to the design of Naval Engineer Lieutenant João Cândido Brazil, all based on the plans of the British gunboats HMS Medina and HMS Medway. Iniciadora became the first Brazilian warship built with an iron hull. Construction was carried out by the Arsenal de Marinha do Rio de Janeiro, formerly the Court Navy Arsenal. Her keel was laid on October 27, 1881, by Emperor Pedro II of Brazil and she was launched on April 21, 1883.

When the ship was launched, she began to sink due to the incorrect installation of the rivets in her iron hull, through which the water entered. Repair work was delayed, as the dock workers were divided between building this and other gunboats, as well as repairing other ships already in service. The ship was only incorporated on May 12, 1885.

== Characteristics ==
Iniciadora had a total displacement of 270 tons, was 37.30 meters long overall, and 35 meters between perpendiculars, with a beam of 7.88 meters, a depth of 2.44 meters, and a draft of 1.65 meters. Propulsion consisted of a steam engine generating 260 HP of total power of the compound type, which drove two propellers and gave the vessel a maximum speed of nine knots. The primary armament consisted of two 120-millimeter Armstrong cannons, one forward and one aft, while the secondary armament included four 37-millimeter Armstrong cannons; two 25-millimeter Nordenfelt machine guns, and four other machine guns of unspecified caliber; the hull made of cast iron Ipanema structure and German steel plating and profiles was protected from corrosion by a wooden lining covered with copper sheets. She had two redoubts armored with 10-millimeter-thick steel plates that protected the cannons. The characteristics of the ship made her most suitable for coastal defense, sheltered waters, and river borders. The crew consisted of 51 officers and men.

== History ==
After speed tests, the ship was incorporated into the Mato Grosso Flotilla in July 1885, where she spent her entire career. In February 1892, a conflict erupted in Mato Grosso led by former state president Antônio Maria Coelho, who had been removed from office a year earlier by Brazilian president Deodoro da Fonseca. In the year of the revolt, Deodoro resigned and Coelho tried to return to power by proclaiming the Transatlantic Republic of Mato Grosso. He obtained the support of the 7th Light Cavalry Regiment from Nioaque, around 200 Brazilian Army soldiers, and three of the four vessels of the Mato Grosso Flotilla, including the Iniciadora. The land battles took place in the capital Cuiabá, Rosário, and Corumbá.

By May, the opposing forces had almost been defeated. On the 18th, the Iniciadora docked in Asunción, to provide information about what was happening in Mato Grosso. However, the gunboat was prevented from returning by the Paraguayan government, an action requested by the Brazilian ambassador in Asunción. The commander of the Mato Grosso Flotilla in Asunción, Lieutenant Francisco Forjaz de Lacerda, threatened to open fire on the Iniciadora with the gunboat Taquari. Before there could be any offensive reaction from the gunboat, the crew decided to surrender to Lacerda. The conflict ended in July. The following year, during the Brazilian Naval Revolts, the ship was among the fleet supporting the government stationed in Montevideo, also made up of the cruiser Tiradentes (1893) and the monitor Bahia. In the Uruguayan capital, the Iniciadora was carrying out general repairs. Later, the gunboat remained in the Mato Grosso flotilla until she was retired on June 26, 1907.

== See also ==
- Brazilian monitor Bahia
- Anhambaí
- Imperial Brazilian Navy
- List of historical ships of the Brazilian Navy
