= Brazilian ironclad Silvado =

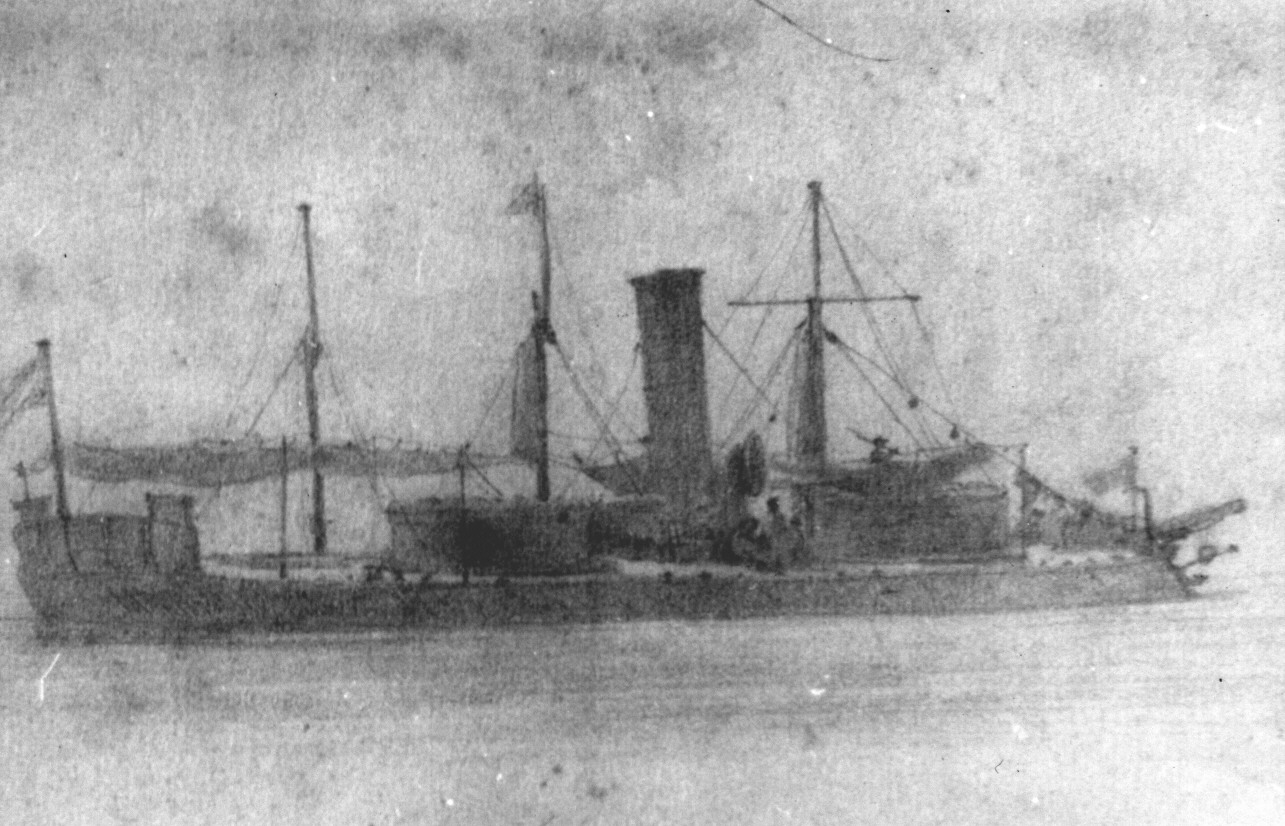

Class overview
- Name: Silvado class
- Operators: Imperial Brazilian Navy
- Preceded by: Brasil
- Succeeded by: Barroso
- Built: 1864–1866
- In commission: 1866–1880
- Completed: 1
- Scrapped: 1

History

Empire of Brazil
- Name: Silvado
- Namesake: Captain Americo Brasilio Silvado
- Builder: Arman Brothers, Bordeaux
- Laid down: 1864
- Launched: 1865
- Completed: 15 September 1866
- Stricken: 3 June 1880

General characteristics
- Type: Ironclad turret ship
- Displacement: 1,350 metric tons (1,330 long tons)
- Length: 66 m (216 ft 6 in) (p.p.)
- Beam: 11.6 m (38 ft 1 in)
- Draft: 3.9 m (13 ft)
- Installed power: 950 ihp (710 kW)
- Propulsion: 2 shafts, 2 trunk steam engines
- Sail plan: Barque-rigged
- Speed: 10 knots (19 km/h; 12 mph)
- Complement: 170 officers and men
- Armament: 2 × twin 70-pounder Whitworth rifled muzzle loader guns
- Armor: Belt: 3–4.5 in (76–114 mm); Gun turret: 4.5 in (110 mm)

The Brazilian ironclad Silvado was originally ordered by Paraguay in 1864 with the name Nemesis, but was sold to Brazil when Paraguay could not make the final payments. She participated in the 1864–70 War of the Triple Alliance between Brazil, Argentina and Uruguay against Paraguay.

== Design and description ==
Silvado was 216 feet 6 inches (66.0 m) long between perpendiculars, had a beam of 45 feet 10 inches (14.0 m) and a maximum draft of 7 feet 6 inches (2.3 m). Lima Barros displaced 1,350 long tons (1,370 t) and was fitted with a ram bow. Her crew consisted of 170 officers and enlisted men. The ship had a pair of horizontal trunk steam engines, each driving one propeller shaft. The engines produced a total of 950 indicated horsepower (710 kW) and gave Silvado a maximum speed of 10 knots (19 km/h; 12 mph). She was barque-rigged with three pole masts and a bowsprit.

Silvado was armed with four 70-pounder Whitworth rifled, muzzle-loading guns mounted in two twin-gun turrets. She had a complete waterline belt of wrought iron that ranged in thickness from 4.5 inches (114 mm) amidships to 3 inches (76 mm) at the ends of the ship. The gun turret was also protected by 4.5 inches of armor.

== Construction and service ==
Silvado, named after Captain Americo Brasilio Silvado, who was killed when his ship, the ironclad Rio de Janeiro, struck a mine and sank, was originally ordered by Paraguay from the French shipbuilding firm of Arman Brothers, and was laid down in 1864 with the name of Nemesis at their Bordeaux shipyard. She was purchased by Brazil the following year, after the start of the war when Paraguay was cut off from the outside world and could no longer make payments. The ship was launched in 1865 and completed on 15 September 1866. She sailed to Brazil under the command of Manoel Antônio Vital de Oliveira later that year.

== See also ==
- List of historical ships of the Brazilian Navy
