= Manoel Antônio Vital de Oliveira =

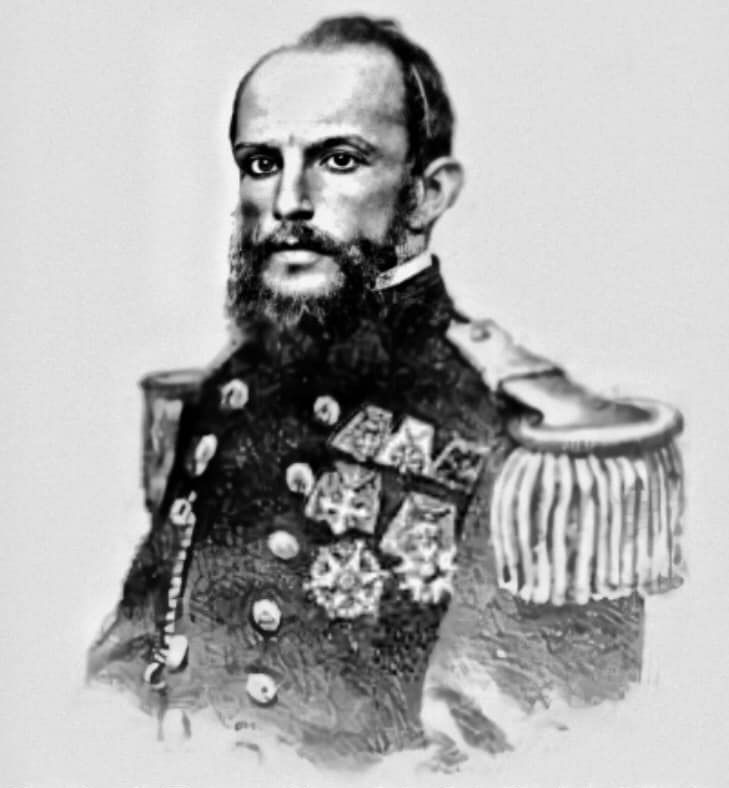
- Born: 28 September 1829; Recife, Pernambuco, Brazil
- Died: 2 February 1867 (aged 37)
- Military career
- Allegiance: Brazil
- Service years: 1845–1867
- Rank: Post-Captain
- Known for: Surveys of the coasts of Brazil
- Awards: Commenda da Ordem de Christo; Chevalier of the Legion of Honour; Chevalier of the Order of Saint Maurice and Saint Lazare; Officer of the Imperial Order of the Rose

Manoel Antônio Vital de Oliveira (28 September 1829 - 2 February 1867) was a Brazilian naval officer and surveyor, known as the "Father of Brazilian Hydrography".

He was born in Recife in the state of Pernambuco. His father was Antônio Vital de Oliveira and his mother was Donna Joanna Florinda de Gusmão Lobo Vital. He graduated from the naval school at Rio de Janeiro in 1843 and became a midshipman in 1845. In February 1849 he was involved in the suppression of the Praieira revolt, taking part in a battle in his home town of Recife. He was promoted to sub-lieutenant in December 1849 and to Lieutenant in 1854.

Vital de Oliveira's 1862 chart of the coast of Brazil including Recife

Vital de Oliveira's first survey was of the coast of Brazil between Pitimbu and São Bento in the sloop of war Parahybano. The chart from this survey was accompanied by a detailed description. In 1858 he published a chart of das Rocas, a coral atoll in the South Atlantic. In 1862 he published five charts covering the coast from Mossoró to the São Francisco River. These charts were subsequently re-published in 1864 as United Kingdom Admiralty charts.

In 1862, Joachim Raimundo de Lamare, Minister of the Navy, decided to commission a complete chart of the Brazilian Coast, and appointed Vital de Oliveira, then commanding Ipiranga, to start preliminary work on this. De Lamare also prepared a plan for a permanent Hydrographic service, but both projects were interrupted by the outbreak of the Paraguayan War, and the Hydrographic service was not formed until 1876. Vital de Oliveira's survey work thus anticipated by nearly two decades the formation of an official Hydrographic Service by the Brazilian Navy.

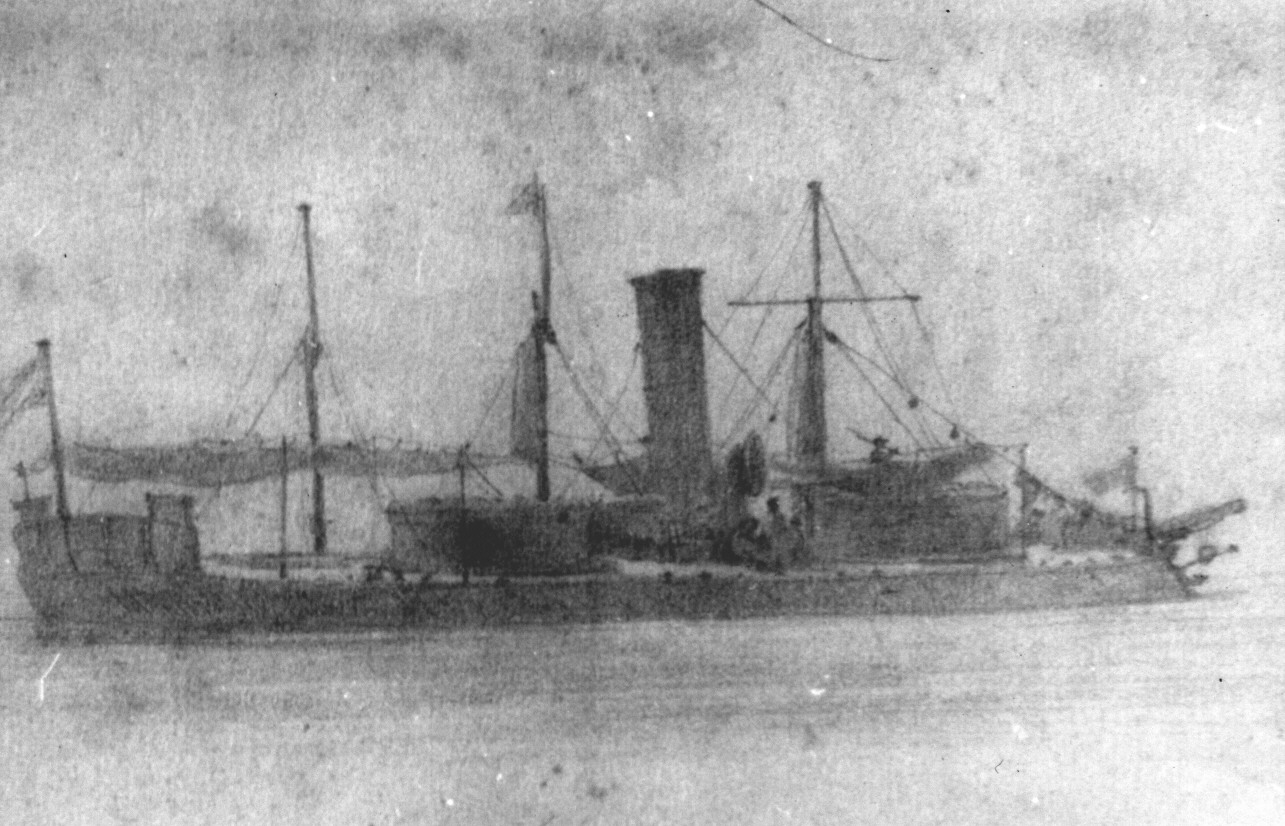
the Silvado

Vital de Oliveira's first assignment during the Paraguayan War was to travel to France to take possession of the ironclad Nemesis and take it to Brazil in 1866. Crossing the Atlantic, he met with tempestuous weather, but brought the ship safely into Rio de Janeiro. The ship was renamed the Silvado, and joined the war under the command of Vital de Oliveira, who had been promoted to Post-Captain on 21 January 1867. On the 2 February, the Brazilian fleet, with Silvado as its flagship, started a bombardment of the fortifications at Curupaiti. The Paraguayans returned fire, and Vital de Oliveira was killed while directing the bombardment from the bridge of his ship.

Three naval ships have been named after him:

- The corvette Vital de Oliveira, which was the first Brazilian ship to circumnavigate the globe, in 1876.
- The auxiliary ship Vital de Oliveira, which was sunk by a German U-boat torpedo attack on 20 July 1944.
- The research vessel Vital de Oliveira which entered service in 2015.

Vital de Oliveira was named Patrono da Hidrografia da Marinha by decree on 21 January 1976. His date of birth is marked in Brazil as "Hydrographer's Day".
