= Brazilian ship Rio Grande do Sul =

Three ships of the Brazilian Navy have been named Rio Grande do Sul:

- Brazilian cruiser Rio Grande do Sul, a Bahia-class cruiser launched in 1909 and decommissioned in 1948
- Brazilian submarine Rio Grande do Sul (S11) (Balao class), the former American Balao-class submarine USS Sand Lance (SS-381); in Brazilian Navy service, 1963–1972; cannibalized for spare parts and scrapped by 1975
- Brazilian submarine Rio Grande do Sul (S11) (Tench class), the former American Tench-class submarine USS Grampus (SS-523); in Brazilian Navy service, 1973–1993
