= USS Albert David =

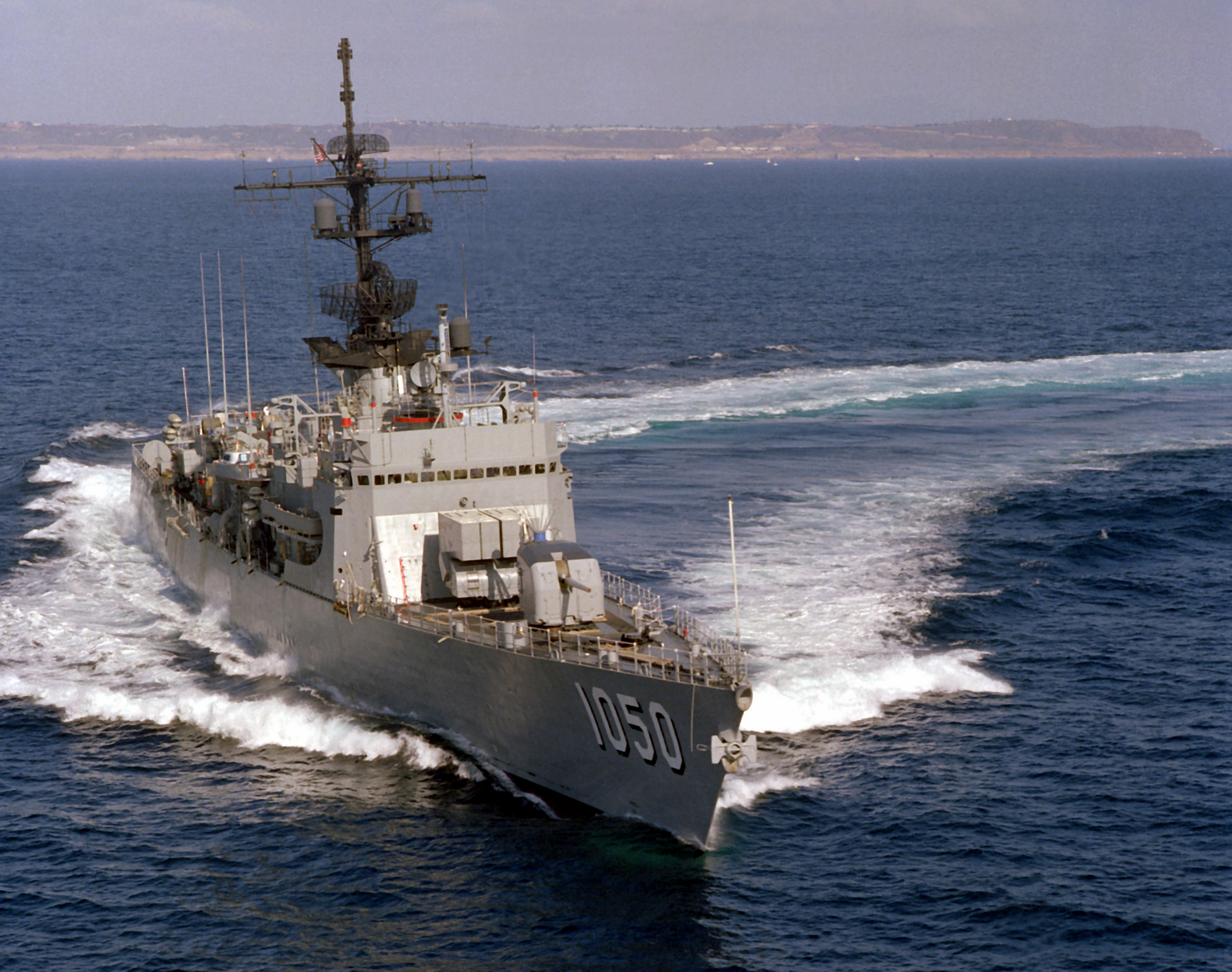
- USS Albert David (FF-1050)

History

United States
- Name: Albert David
- Namesake: Albert David
- Ordered: 20 March 1963
- Builder: Lockheed Shipbuilding and Construction Company
- Laid down: 29 April 1964
- Launched: 19 December 1964
- Acquired: 11 October 1968
- Commissioned: 19 October 1968
- Decommissioned: 28 September 1988
- Stricken: 24 January 2001
- Nickname(s): The Vigilant Shepherd
- Honours and awards: Combat Action Ribbon, Meritorious Unit Citation
- Fate: Initially leased, then sold to Brazil 24 January 2001

Brazil
- Name: Pará
- Namesake: Pará
- Acquired: 18 September 1989
- Decommissioned: 12 November 2008
- Identification: D27
- Fate: Scrapped, 2015

General characteristics
- Class & type: Garcia-class frigate
- Displacement: 2,624 tons (light); 3,400 tons full
- Length: 414 ft 6 in (126.34 m)
- Beam: 44 ft 1 in (13.44 m)
- Draft: 24 ft 6 in (7.47 m)
- Propulsion: 2 Foster-Wheeler boilers, 1 steam turbine, 35,000 shp (26,000 kW), single screw
- Speed: 27 knots (50 km/h; 31 mph)
- Range: 4,000 nautical miles (7,400 km; 4,600 mi) at 20 knots (37 km/h; 23 mph)
- Complement: 16 officers; 231 enlisted
- Sensors & processing systems: AN/SPS-40 air search radar; AN/SPS-10 surface search radar; AN/SQS-26 bow mounted sonar
- Armament: 2 × single 5 in (127 mm)/38 cal. Mk 30 guns; 1 × 8-tube ASROC Mk16 launcher (16 missiles); 2 × triple 12.75 in (324 mm) Mk 32 torpedo tubes, Mk 46 torpedoes; 2 × MK 37 torpedo tubes (fixed, stern) (removed later)
- Aircraft carried: Gyrodyne QH-50 (planned) / SH-2 LAMPS

USS Albert David (FF-1050) was a Garcia-class destroyer escort, later reclassified as a frigate, in the United States Navy. She was named for Lieutenant Albert David, a Medal of Honor recipient. His was the only Medal of Honor awarded to a member of the Navy in the Atlantic Theater of Operations in World War II. Laid down on 28 April 1964 and commissioned on 19 October 1968, Albert David served in the Pacific, including performing gunfire support operations in Vietnam during the 1970s. She was briefly deployed to the Arabian Sea in September and October 1982. On 18 September 1989 she was leased to the Brazilian Navy, and then sold to Brazil where she served as the destroyer Pará (D 27) until 12 November 2008 when she was decommissioned and put in reserve. She appears to have been scrapped as of 2015.

== Construction ==
Albert David was laid down on 28 April 1964 at Seattle, Washington, by the Lockheed Shipbuilding and Construction Co.; launched on 19 December 1964; sponsored by Mrs. Lynda Mae David; and commissioned at the Puget Sound Naval Shipyard on 19 October 1968.

== History ==
For the remainder of 1968, Albert David completed outfitting at Bremerton, Washington, and conducted post-commissioning trials and tests. Those examinations continued into 1969. A voyage to Hawaii followed in March. Early in April, the ocean escort began five weeks of refresher training out of San Diego. On 1 May 1969, she was assigned to Long Beach, California, as her home port. She concluded refresher training eight days later and arrived in Long Beach on 10 May. On 12 May, however, Albert David headed back to Bremerton for an eight-week, post-shakedown availability at the Puget Sound Naval Shipyard. The warship returned to sea on 7 July, bound for the coast of southern California and several days of operations out of San Diego. She returned to Long Beach on the 18th.

Albert David carried out normal operations from the base at Long Beach until the beginning of the second week in October. On 8 October, she stood out of Long Beach on her first deployment to the western Pacific. After steaming via Pearl Harbor and Midway Island, the warship arrived in Yokosuka, Japan, on 31 October. Albert David then served two weeks on the Taiwan Strait patrol and visited Subic Bay in the Philippines before reporting at Danang, South Vietnam, on 24 November to begin Vietnam War gunfire support duty. That assignment lasted until 10 December when, after a brief stop at Da Nang, the ocean escort headed for the Gulf of Tonkin. From 11 to 18 December, she operated on the south air-sea rescue (ASR) station in the gulf. On 16 December, Albert David joined company with the aircraft carrier USS Hancock for two days of plane guard duty. The warship left station in the Gulf of Tonkin on 18 December and headed for Bangkok, Thailand, where her crew enjoyed a five-day port visit. On 30 December, she rendezvoused with the carrier USS Coral Sea and began five weeks of plane guard duty with the carriers of Task Force 77 (TF 77).

=== 1970s ===
Early in February 1970, she left the Gulf of Tonkin to make port visits at Subic Bay and Hong Kong. On her way back to Vietnamese waters, Albert David visited Okinawa and, during that visit, put to sea to investigate a Soviet trawler loitering in the area. She returned to Danang on 27 February to resume gunfire support missions for the troops fighting ashore. At the beginning of the second week in March, she left the gunline to rejoin the carriers of TF 77 in the Gulf of Tonkin. Eight days later, she pulled into Subic Bay to make preparations for the voyage back to the United States. On 21 March, Albert David stood out of Subic Bay on her way home.

The warship made stops at Guam, Midway and Pearl Harbor before arriving in Long Beach on 9 April. Following post-deployment standdown, Albert David settled into the normal schedule of training operations carried out by warships between overseas deployments. Those evolutions occupied her time until the beginning of November when she entered the Long Beach Naval Shipyard. Albert David's first regular overhaul lasted more than eight months.

On 1 July 1971, she put to sea for post-overhaul trials and drills, and she remained so occupied for the remainder of the month. August brought refresher training out of San Diego, and September saw her resume normal 1st Fleet operations out of Long Beach.

On 12 November 1971, Albert David departed Long Beach on her second deployment to the Far East. En route, she spent more than a week in the Hawaiian Islands before continuing on to the Philippines. She arrived in Subic Bay on 9 December and remained there almost a week. On the 15th, she put to sea bound for the Gulf of Tonkin, arriving on station two days later. Albert David spent the following six weeks on gunfire support station off the coast of Vietnam. At the end of January 1972, she headed back to Subic Bay to rest, rearm, and reprovision. The warship returned to the combat zone this time in the Gulf of Siam off the shores of South Vietnam's IV Corps on 6 February and resumed duty as a seaborne heavy artillery battery supporting ground forces ashore.

Albert David left the Gulf of Siam on 24 February bound for the Gulf of Tonkin. She rendezvoused with the aircraft carrier USS Constellation on 29 February and served as the carrier's escort for two days of operations in the Gulf of Tonkin as well as during the voyage to Subic Bay. After 10 days of upkeep and repairs at Subic Bay, the ocean escort departed the Philippines for Hong Kong on 14 March. The port visit at Hong Kong lasted from 16 to 22 March. On the latter day, the warship laid in a course that took her via Okinawa to the Sea of Japan. She conducted antisubmarine warfare (ASW) exercises between 26 and 29 March and made a port call at Yokosuka, Japan, from 30 March to 5 April.

After a false start for home on the 5th and a return to Japan to reload necessary equipment, Albert David headed back to Vietnamese waters that same day. Reporting for gunfire support duty off the Vietnamese Demilitarized Zone (DMZ) between North Vietnam and South Vietnam on 10 April she performed a variety of other tasks as well. On 11 and 12 April Albert David participated in action while encountering enemy hostile fire. The crew received the Combat Action Ribbon. After four days of gunfire support missions, the warship joined the cruiser USS Long Beach for 10 days of escort duty on picket station. From 28 April to 12 May, she again provided gunfire support. Albert David concluded that tour of duty in the combat zone with four days of service with the landing platform dock USS Denver on the notification line established to warn merchant ships about mines in North Vietnamese harbors.

On 17 May, she set out for Subic Bay in company with Constellation. The two warships visited Subic Bay from 19 to 22 May and then got underway for Singapore. After a four-day port call at Singapore, they returned to sea on 30 May on their way back to the waters surrounding Vietnam. Albert David parted company with Constellation on 2 June to render gunfire support to troops in I and II Corps in South Vietnam. At the end of 10 days on the gunline, she formed up with Constellation again on 12 June. The two warships stopped at Subic Bay on 15 June and returned to sea almost immediately. On 20 June, they arrived in Yokosuka for a two-day port call before beginning the voyage across the Pacific. Albert David and Constellation cleared Yokosuka on 22 June bound for the United States. Albert David escorted the carrier until 30 June when she received orders to proceed independently. The ocean escort entered Long Beach the following morning.

Following a month-long post-deployment leave and upkeep period, the ocean escort began normal 1st Fleet operations on 3 August with plane guard services for the carrier USS Ranger in the southern California operating area. On 26 August, she put to sea from Long Beach to participate in Operation "RimPac-72," conducted in the Hawaiian Islands with units of the navies of Australia, Canada and New Zealand. Albert David returned to Long Beach from that exercise on 19 September and remained in port for three weeks. At that time, she resumed normal operations along the California coast.

The warship performed training duties out of Long Beach until near the end of the first week in January 1973. On the 5th, she stood out to sea on her way back to the Far East. Steaming in company with Constellation, Albert David completed the transit of the Pacific at Subic Bay on 22 January. Four days later, she embarked upon the voyage to the Gulf of Tonkin, again escorting Constellation. For the next three weeks, she provided plane guard services and antisubmarine protection for the carriers of TF 77 during what proved to be her last tour of duty in the gulf before the United States pulled out of the Vietnam War. Albert David returned to Subic Bay on 14 February and spent the next three weeks undergoing minor repairs and conducting training in the Philippines.

On 6 March, Albert David departed Iloilo on the island of Panay to return to Vietnamese waters. This time, however, her mission was a peaceful one. She was part of Operation End Sweep, the removal of mines from North Vietnamese waters. Her participation in that effort punctuated by port visits to Sasebo in Japan, Subic Bay in the Philippines, and Hong Kong lasted until the second week in June. The warship cleared Vietnamese waters on 9 June, visited Keelung on Taiwan on 12 and 13 June, and arrived in Yokosuka on the 17th. Two days later, the ocean escort returned to sea for the voyage back to the United States. She made brief stops for fuel at Midway Island and Pearl Harbor before reaching Long Beach on 3 July.

Post-deployment standdown followed by a lengthy restricted availability at the Todd Shipyard in San Pedro occupied her time until late November. She returned to Long Beach on 21 November but remained there only long enough to make preparations to move to San Diego, the new home port to which she had been assigned on 20 August. Albert David made the home port shift on 1 December and commenced local operations out of San Diego six days later. The warship continued that employment through the end of 1973 and during the first four months of 1974. On 23 April 1974, she left San Diego in company with the destroyers USS Leonard F. Mason and USS Waddell bound for the western Pacific. Albert David and her travelling companions made fuel stops at Pearl Harbor and Midway Island before arriving in Yokosuka on 14 May. On 25 May, the ocean escort put to sea in a task group built around the aircraft carrier USS Midway to conduct operations off the island of Honshū. Thus she began her first period of service with the 7th Fleet in which combat duty off the Vietnamese coast played no role. The warship alternated between periods of training at sea and port calls at such places as Yokosuka, Hong Kong, Guam, and Subic Bay.

When she returned to San Diego on 22 October 1974, Albert David embarked upon a period of almost 42 months without a deployment to the Far East. She spent most of the remainder of 1974 in port, initially engaged in post-deployment standdown and later in holiday routine. The ocean escort conducted a number of exercises in 1975. Late March and early April brought a voyage to Hawaii for Operation "RIMPAC" 1-75, a multinational exercise conducted in cooperation with the navies of Australia, New Zealand, and Canada. In mid-April, she returned to the west coast and resumed local operations. On 30 June 1975, Albert David was reclassified a frigate and redesignated FF-1050. In September, she made another cruise to the Hawaiian Islands where she spent four weeks engaged in exercises before returning to San Diego early in November. Local operations again occupied her time, some of which involved serving as a test platform for a new Towed Array Sonar System (TASS) until the spring of 1976. Late in April 1976, the frigate sailed to Long Beach where she began an 11-month regular overhaul on 22 April. Albert David concluded her repairs at the Long Beach Naval Shipyard on St. Patrick's Day 1977 and returned to San Diego nine days later. She operated on a normal training schedule out of her home port until the beginning of August when she voyaged to Hawaii again for training purposes. Returning to San Diego on 29 August, the frigate settled into a normal west coast training schedule once more.

The hiatus in Far Eastern deployments came to an end in the spring of 1978. Albert David stood out of San Diego on 4 April and set a course for Hawaii. En route there, she participated in "RIMPAC" 1-78. After a stop at Pearl Harbor, the frigate continued her voyage west on 25 April. She arrived in Subic Bay on 16 May. During the ensuing five months, Albert David conducted exercises with units of the 7th Fleet and participated in the binational Exercise "Sharkhunt XXVII" with elements of the Republic of China Navy. She also visited ports in Japan, South Korea and Taiwan. The frigate concluded that tour of duty in the Far East with a readiness exercise and a series of special operations. After a visit to Guam between 11 and 14 October, Albert David embarked upon the voyage back to the United States. She reentered San Diego on 29 October and, except for a two-day period underway locally, spent the remainder of 1978 in port.

Twelve days into 1979, the warship began the usual schedule of training operations, trials and inspections. That employment occupied her time through the first 10 months of the year. On 13 November 1979, she left San Diego to return to the western Pacific. Albert David made a very brief stop at Pearl Harbor on 21 November resuming her voyage west that same day. She arrived at Subic Bay on 9 December and spent the remainder of the year in port.

=== 1980s ===
The frigate operated locally out of Luzon ports until the second week in February 1980 when she embarked upon a voyage to Singapore in company with the cruisers Long Beach, USS Worden, and the frigate USS Bronstein. A main engine casualty, however, forced her return to Subic Bay under tow of Long Beach and, later, of USNS Ute. She remained in Subic Bay from 12 February through the end of the month. The warship returned to sea on 1 March for two weeks of exercises followed by a port visit at Buckner Bay, Okinawa.

After an antisubmarine warfare exercise and another stop at Buckner Bay, Albert David set a course for Pusan, Korea, on 23 March. The warship spent the last week of the month indulging in liberty at Pusan. From there, she moved on to Sasebo, Japan, for a repair and upkeep period preparatory to her return to the United States. On 9 April 1980, the frigate departed Sasebo and embarked upon the voyage home by way of Guam, Kwajalein, and Pearl Harbor. She reentered San Diego on 2 May. Post deployment standdown occupied the remainder of May while June and July brought a resumption of local operations. Early in August, she visited Alaskan waters before beginning regular overhaul at the Puget Sound Naval Shipyard at mid-month.

Those repairs occupied the frigate for the rest of 1980 and for the first nine months of 1981. Early in October 1981, Albert David resumed local operations out of San Diego. That duty kept her busy until near the end of May 1982. On 29 May, she got underway for the western Pacific via Pearl Harbor. The frigate arrived in Subic Bay on 2 July. After almost three weeks at that base in the Philippines, Albert David moved north to Sasebo, Japan, where she stayed from 26 July until 12 August. The warship arrived back in Subic Bay on 17 August but set sail again four days later on the 21st in company with the destroyer USS John Young and stores ship USS San Jose bound for the Arabian Sea and a tour of duty with the Middle East Force. She performed surveillance chores in the Arabian Sea from 7 September to 18 October. On 19 October, Albert David started out on the long voyage back to the United States. She entered San Diego on 30 November and spent the remainder of 1982 engaged in post-deployment leave and upkeep.

Standdown carried over well into the third week of 1983. On 20 January, Albert David took up local operations out of San Diego with a three-day readiness exercise. A variety of training evolutions conducted in the waters off the coast of southern California occupied her time during the nine months between January and October 1983. On 4 October, however, the frigate stood out to sea on her way to the Far East once more. She made a five-day stop at Pearl Harbor and conducted a battle problem in the Mariana Islands before steaming into Subic Bay at the beginning of the second week in November. At mid-month, Albert David put to sea again to participate in a series of bilateral exercises with units of the Royal Malaysian Navy, the Royal Singapore Navy, and the Navy of the Republic of Korea. Interspersed among those exercises were goodwill and liberty calls at Lumut in Malaysia, Singapore, Chinhae in Korea, and at Hong Kong. On 28 December, she returned to the Philippines at Manila where she ushered in the new year.

Albert David's western Pacific deployment continued until early April 1984. January brought a visit to Cebu City in the Philippines, a brief return to Subic Bay, and another bilateral exercise, this time with the Royal Thai Navy. Exercises with other units of the 7th Fleet followed. At the end of January, the frigate sailed north to Japan for upkeep and repairs at Yokosuka. At the beginning of the last week in February, the warship completed repairs and put to sea to conduct antisubmarine warfare exercises with elements of the Japanese Maritime Self-Defense Force. The end of February and beginning of March brought visits to Sasebo and Fukuoka in Japan. During mid-March, she operated with South Korean Navy units again and then made port visits at Chinhae and Pusan, Korea, and at Sasebo, Japan. Albert David departed Sasebo on 3 April on her way back to the United States. En route, she lingered in the Marianas to participate in another battle problem and stopped at Pearl Harbor on 21 and 22 April. The warship pulled into San Diego on 30 April. Post-deployment standdown took up the month of May, and operations along the California coast occupied the summer and early fall of 1984. At the beginning of November, Albert David began restricted availability at the Long Beach Naval Shipyard.

That repair period carried her into 1985. Back in San Diego by 5 January, she resumed local operations by the end of the month. The frigate settled into a schedule of training exercises along the west coast, highlighted by port visits to Canadian and United States cities, that kept her busy throughout 1985 and nearly through 1986. On 29 September 1986, Albert David entered the yard of the National Steel & Shipbuilding Co. at San Diego to begin regular overhaul. Upon completion the ship participated in numerous ASW and detailed testing platform operations in the North Pacific and mid Pacific Islands as a member of DESRON 31 until on 18 September 1989 she was decommissioned.

Albert David earned three battle stars for service in the Vietnam War.

== Brazilian service ==
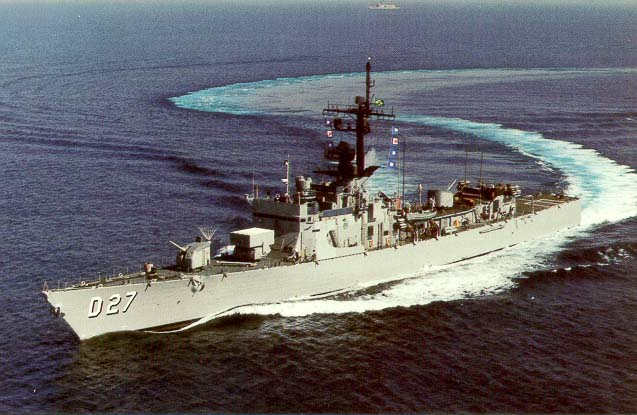
Pará (D27)

The Brazilian Navy leased the ship from its date of decommissioning from the USN on 18 September 1989, renaming the ship as the destroyer Pará (D 27). Brazil later purchased the vessel outright on 24 January 2001 and it was struck from the US' Naval Vessel Register that same date. It served with Brazil until 12 November 2008 when she was decommissioned, and sat in reserve till 2015, when she was scrapped.
