= Brazilian tanker Marajó =

Brazilian Navy oiler Marajó

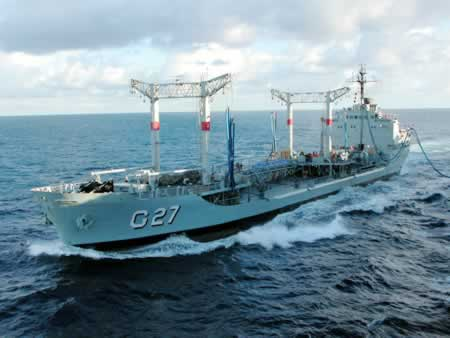
- NT Marajó

History

Brazil
- Name: Marajó
- Namesake: Marajó
- Ordered: 23 November 1965
- Builder: Ishikawajima do Brasil Estaleiros
- Launched: 31 January 1968
- Acquired: 22 October 1968
- Commissioned: 8 January 1969
- Decommissioned: 21 November 2016
- Home port: Rio de Janeiro
- Identification: Pennant number: G27; IMO number: 6808064; MMSI number: 710448000; Callsign: PWMJ
- Status: Decommissioned

General characteristics
- Type: Tanker
- Displacement: 12,889 t (12,685 long tons) (standard); 16,000 t (15,747 long tons) (full load)
- Length: 134.4 m (441 ft)
- Beam: 19.3 m (63 ft)
- Draught: 7.3 m (24 ft)
- Speed: 13 knots (24 km/h; 15 mph)
- Range: 9,200 nmi (17,000 km; 10,600 mi) at 13 knots (24 km/h; 15 mph)
- Capacity: 6,600 t (6,496 long tons) (fuel)
- Complement: 121 crew
- Crew: 121

NT Marajó is a tanker of the Brazilian Navy.

== Construction and career ==
The Marajó was ordered by the Brazilian Navy on 23 November 1965 to be built by Ishikawajimado do Brasil Estaleiros in Rio de Janeiro. The ship was launched on 31 January 1968, and was commissioned on 8 January 1969. She was put into the Command of the 1st Support Squadron, she was responsible for refueling, at sea, the ships of the Brazilian Navy, through the transfer of fuel oil.

Oil transfer work at sea was carried out on either side of the vessel. The Marajó was the Navy's only tanker capable of carrying the fuel used by the NAe São Paulo (A-12).

On 22 January 1969, it carried out its first Oil Transfer at Sea with CT Santa Catarina. Between June 1969 and July 1975, the ship chartered to the National Oil Tanker Fleet (FRONAPE), making several commercial trips to transport oil. During that year, she also participated in UNITAS X.

In January 1979, she participated in Operation ASPIRANTEX/79.

Between 7 and 28 January 1980, she participated in the ASPIRANTEX/80. Between September and October, he participated in the 2nd Phase of Operation UNITAS XXI. In the first half of November, he participated in Operation DRAGON XVI.

Between 2 and 20 August 1981, the ship participated in Operation UNITAS XXII, between September 28 and October 15, he participated in Operation FRATERNO III and in November, she participated in the INOPINEX 81.

Between 5 and 15 January 1982, she participated in Operation ASPIRANTEX/82.

In October 1983, she participated in Operation FRATERNO V in which she carried out in conjunction with Argentine Navy ships on the Santos-Rio region.

In January 1984, she participated in Operation ASPIRANTEX 84/TROPICALEX I/84.

On 211 November 2018, the ship was retired from service after 51 years of service with the Brazilian Navy.
