= Alexandrino Faria de Alencar =

Brazilian admiral and politician (1848–1926)

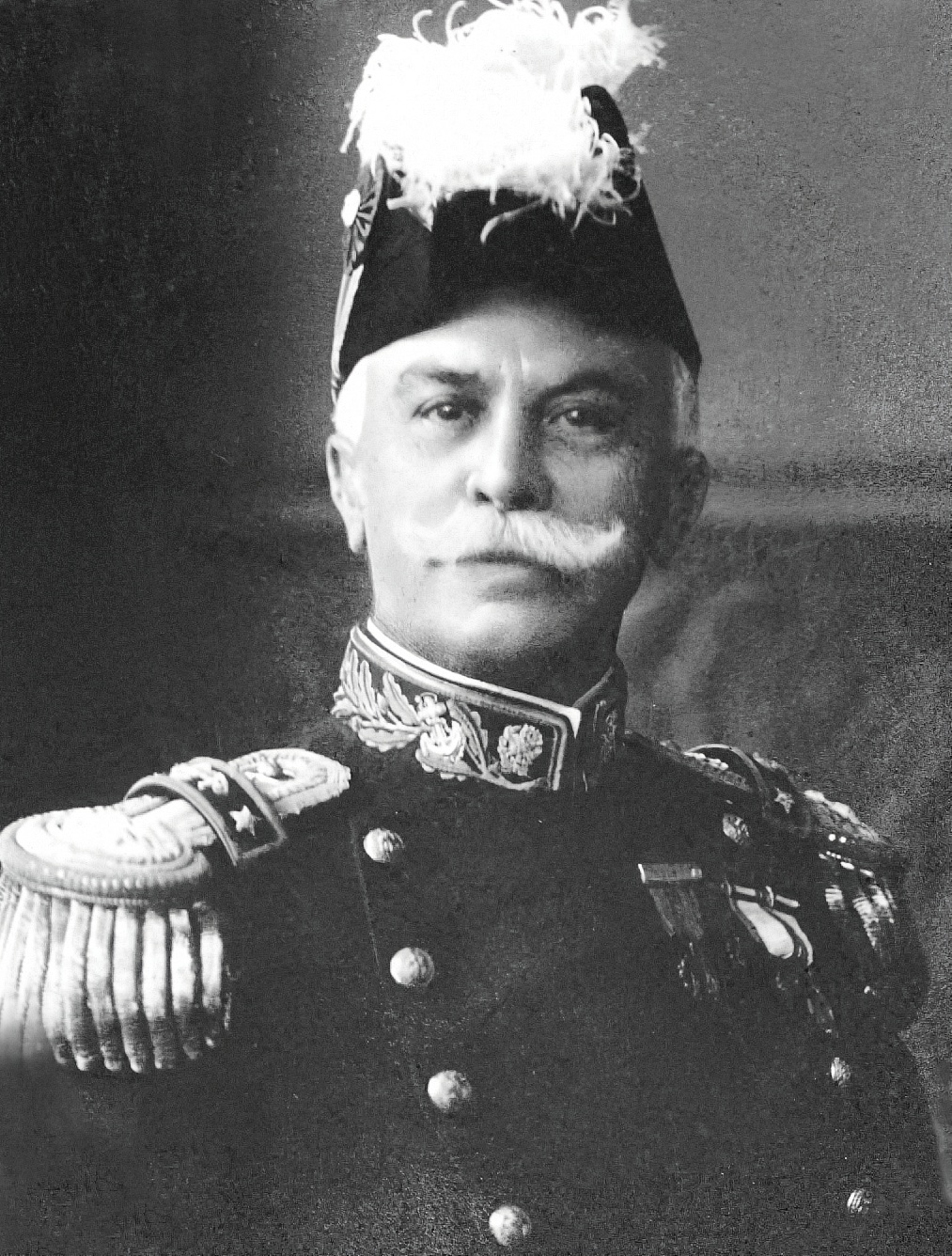
- Alencar, c. 1909

Minister of the Navy
- In office 15 November 1906 – 15 November 1910
- President: Afonso Pena (1906–1909); Nilo Peçanha (1909–1910)
- Preceded by: Júlio César de Noronha
- Succeeded by: Joaquim Marques Batista de Leão
- In office 2 August 1913 – 15 November 1918
- President: Hermes da Fonseca (1910–1914); Venceslau Brás (1914–1918)
- Preceded by: Vespasiano Gonçalves de Albuquerque e Silva
- Succeeded by: Antônio Coutinho Gomes Pereira
- In office 15 November 1922 – 18 April 1926
- President: Artur Bernardes
- Preceded by: João Pedro da Veiga Miranda
- Succeeded by: Arnaldo Pinto da Luz
Other offices held
1921–1922	Senator for Amazonas
1909–1920	Justice of the STM
1906–1906	Senator for Amazonas

Personal details
- Born: 12 October 1848 Rio Pardo, Rio Grande do Sul, Empire of Brazil
- Died: 18 April 1926 (aged 77) Rio de Janeiro, Federal District, Brazil
- Spouse: Amália Murray dos Santos
- Children: Armando de Alencar
- Education: Naval School
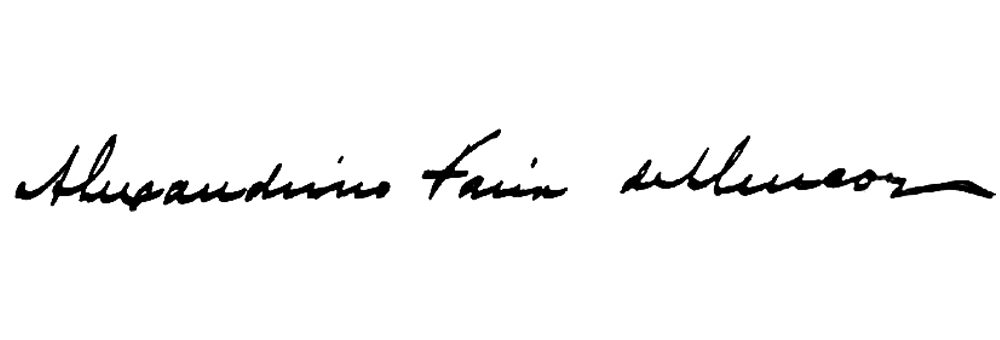
- Signature

Military service
- Allegiance: Empire of Brazil; First Brazilian Republic
- Branch: Imperial Brazilian Navy; Brazilian Navy
- Years of service: 1865–1926
- Rank: Admiral
- Battles/wars: Paraguayan War; Proclamation of the Republic; Brazilian naval revolts

Alexandrino Faria de Alencar (12 October 1848 – 18 April 1926) was a Brazilian admiral and politician who served as Minister of the Navy several times during the First Brazilian Republic. During his many tenures as minister of the navy, Alencar carried out substantial reforms and modernizations in the Brazilian Navy.

Born to a traditional family in Rio Pardo, Rio Grande do Sul, Alencar joined the Naval School in 1865 and took part in the Paraguayan War as part of the Montevideo Naval Squadron. A convinced republican, Alencar sided with the perpetrators of the military coup d'état that overthrew the Brazilian Empire and installed the First Brazilian Republic in 1889. In the aftermath of the coup, Alencar took part in the Naval Revolts of 1891 and 1893 against presidents Deodoro da Fonseca and Floriano Peixoto. During the second revolt, at the head of the battleship Aquidabã, Alencar took part in the battle of Anhatomirim, during which his vessel was torpedoed by a government warship. The revolt was defeated by the federal government and Alencar went into exile in Montevideo.

A defender of heavy capital ships, Alencar headed a movement for the modification of Brazil's 1904 Naval Program, aimed at expanding the country's obsolete fleet, during his first tenure as navy minister. The modifications were approved by Congress in 1907 after the launch of HMS Dreadnought, and included the acquisition of the Minas Geraes-class battleships and several other vessels. This naval expansion sparked a naval arms race between Brazil, Argentina, and Chile.

== Early life and family ==
The son of Alexandrino de Melo Alencar and Ana Ubaldina Faria de Alencar, Alexandrino Faria de Alencar was born on 12 October 1848 in Rio Pardo, Rio Grande do Sul. From a traditional family, his father was a captain in the Imperial Brazilian Army. He was also a great-grandson of French general Pierre Labatut, who fought in the Brazilian War of Independence, and great-grandnephew of Bárbara de Alencar, who took part in the Pernambuco Revolution of 1817 and the Confederation of the Equator.

After finishing his first studies with private tutors, Alencar moved to Rio de Janeiro in the early 1860s in order to prepare to join the Naval School, which he did with the rank of midshipman candidate in 1865. The next year, he volunteered for the Paraguayan War, but was dismissed from service due to his young age. In 1868 he rose to the rank of midshipman and joined the Montevideo Naval Squadron, taking part in the Paraguayan War.

With the end of the war, Alencar returned to Brazil, being promoted to the rank of second lieutenant in 1870 and first lieutenant in 1873. During this period, he made trips to Europe and Africa, served as military attaché to a special mission in China, and travelled the United States. In 1877, he became artillery instructor to the Naval Battalion. From 1879 to 1881 he went on a circumnavigation voyage and in 1883 he became an assistant to frigate captain Custódio de Melo. In 1885 he was promoted to the rank of lieutenant captain. From 1887 to 1888, as chief mate to admiral Saldanha da Gama, he took part in the cruiser Barroso's missions to North America.

Alencar married Amália Murray dos Santos. Together they had one child, Armando de Alencar (b. 1886), who would later become a justice of Brazil's Supreme Federal Court in 1937.

== Republican coup and naval revolts ==
A convinced republican, Alencar commanded the troops that marched to Campo de Santana on 15 November 1889 during the military coup d'état headed by Deodoro da Fonseca that overthrew the Brazilian Empire. With the coup's success, Alencar was given command of the battleship Riachuelo, tasked with escorting the steamer Alagoas that took the Brazilian imperial family into exile in Europe until the limits of Brazil's territorial waters. In 1890, Alencar was promoted to frigate captain.

With Deodoro da Fonseca in power, Alencar opposed his coup that dissolved Congress on 3 November 1891 and established a state of emergency. In response, Custódio de Melo headed a movement to pressure Fonseca to resign on 23 November 1891, which Alencar supported. Fonseca was then succeeded by vice president Floriano Peixoto.

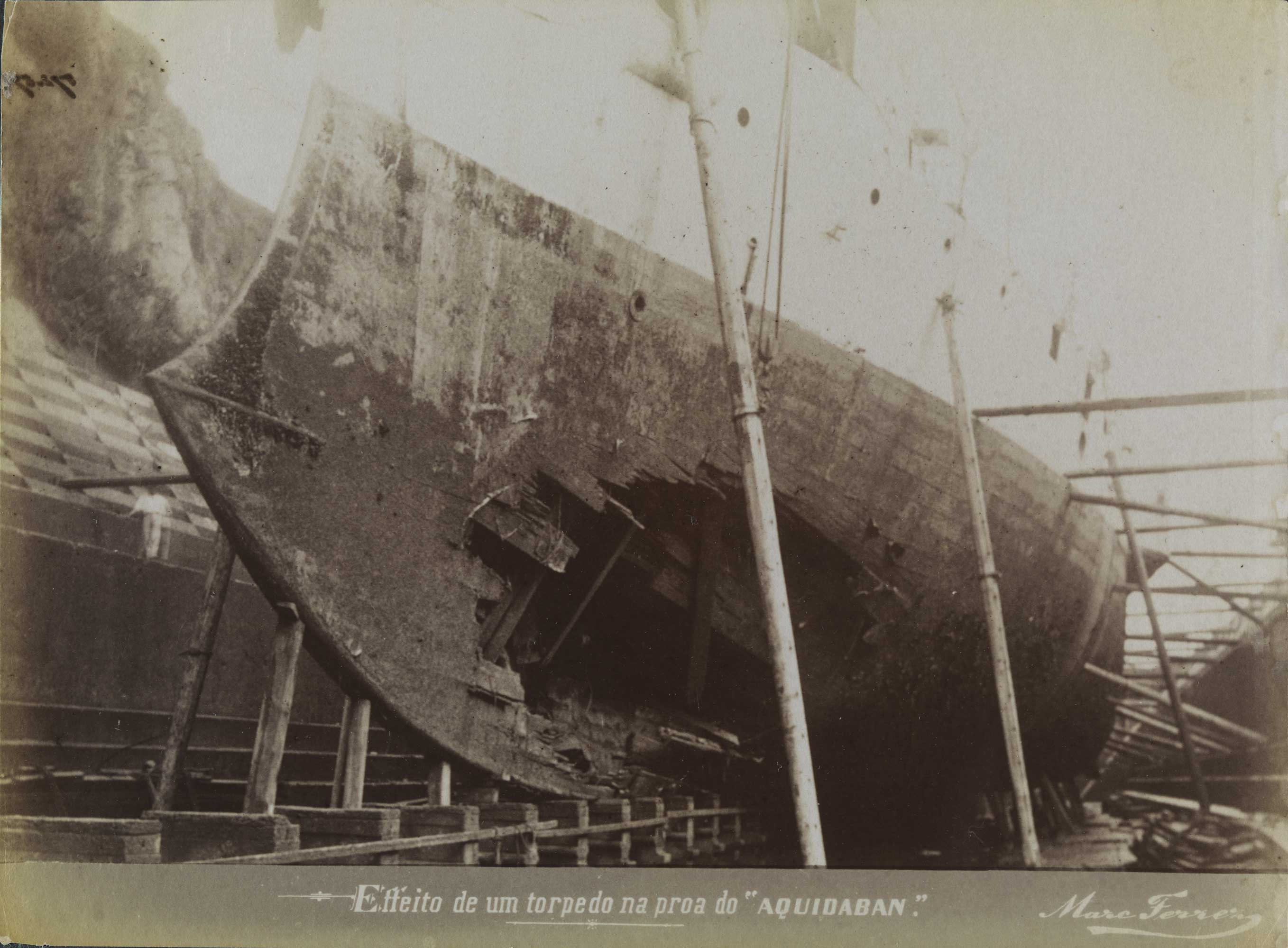
Damage caused to the bow of Aquidabã by the torpedo boat Gustavo Sampaio

In 1893, in command of the battleship Aquidabã, Alencar sided with the navy rebels headed by admirals Saldanha da Gama, Custódio de Melo, and Eduardo Wandenkolk, against Floriano Peixoto. The rebels wanted for new elections to be held. The Second Naval Revolt, as it became known, lastet from September 1893 to March 1894. During its course, the rebel fleet went South in order to join another revolt: the Federalist Revolution that was raging in Southern Brazil, and capture Santa Catarina's capital, the city of Desterro. On 16 April 1894, Aquidabã was torpedoed by the government warship Gustavo Sampaio in the battle of Anhatomirim, partially sinking. (Note: The ship was refloated and taken to Rio de Janeiro for light repairs. It was later sent to Germany for repairs in its hull and engines, and England for its armament. It was reintegrated into the Brazilian Navy in 1897, with much heavier armament (Marinha do Brasil).) The revolt was defeated by the federal government and Alencar went into exile in Montevideo.

== Return to Brazil and career advancement ==
Alencar returned to Brazil in 1897, being amnestied and reintregrated into the navy. In 1899 he was promoted to the rank of commissioned captain of sea and war; the following year he was made effective in the same rank and took over the General Command of the Torpedo Boats. In 1902 he was promoted to counter admiral. The following year he assumed command of the Northern Naval Division. In 1904 he became consultant to the Naval Council in Rio de Janeiro and in 1905 he was given command of the Southern Naval Division.

== Political career ==
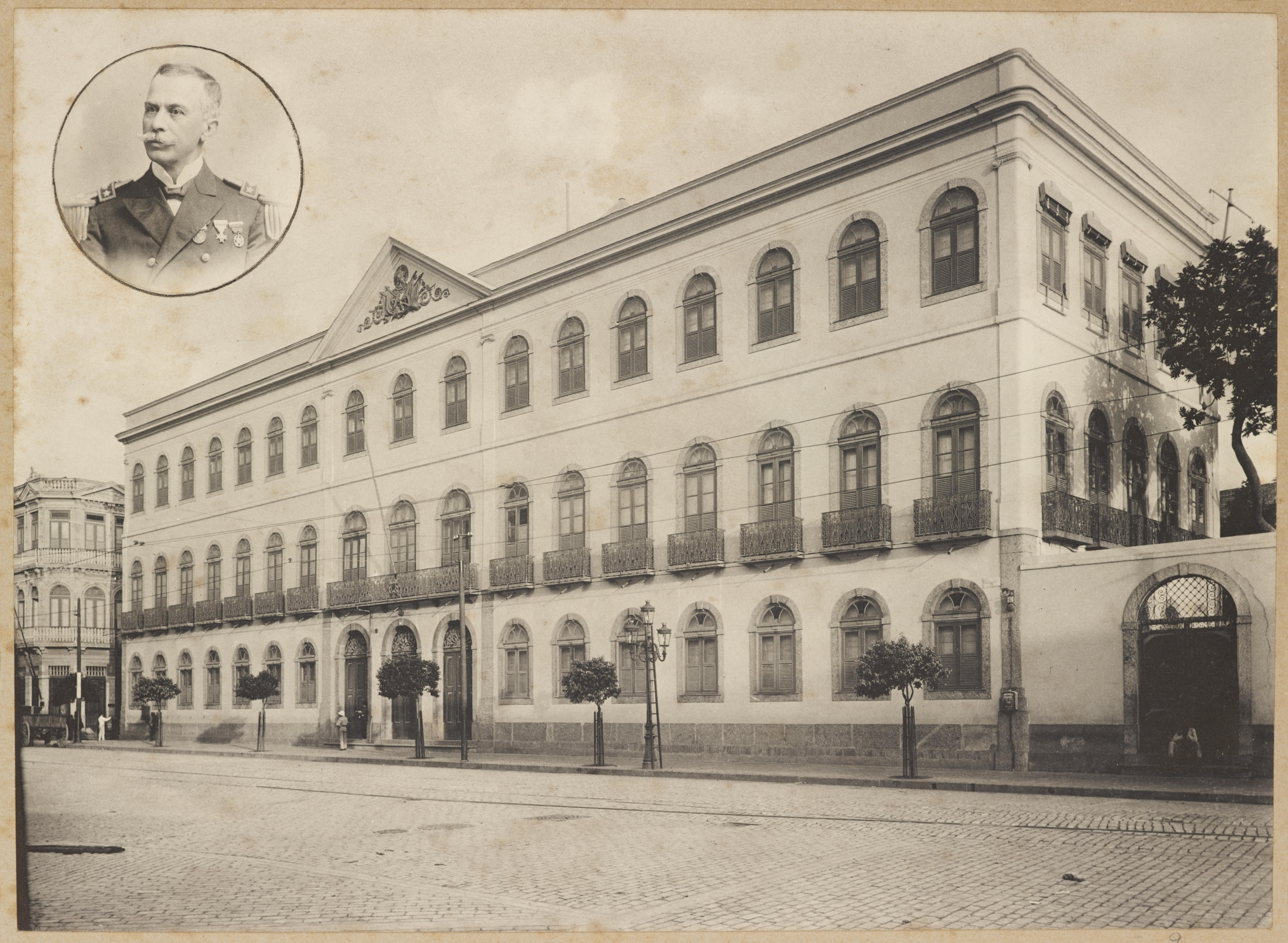
Alencar and the Ministry of the Navy building

In 1905, Alencar was elected senator for Amazonas, taking office in May 1906. As senator, he became an advocate for the adoption of a naval program that matched Brazil's foreign policy and the country's naval rearmament. However, with the beginning of president Afonso Pena's government in November, Alencar was appointed minister of the navy by the president - replacing Júlio César de Noronha - and resigned his position as senator.

As minister of the navy, Alencar was promoted to vice admiral in 1908. The next year he was appointed justice to Brazil's Superior Military Court (STM), an office he occupied for 11 years.

== Death ==
Alencar died on 18 April 1926 in Rio de Janeiro.

== Legacy ==
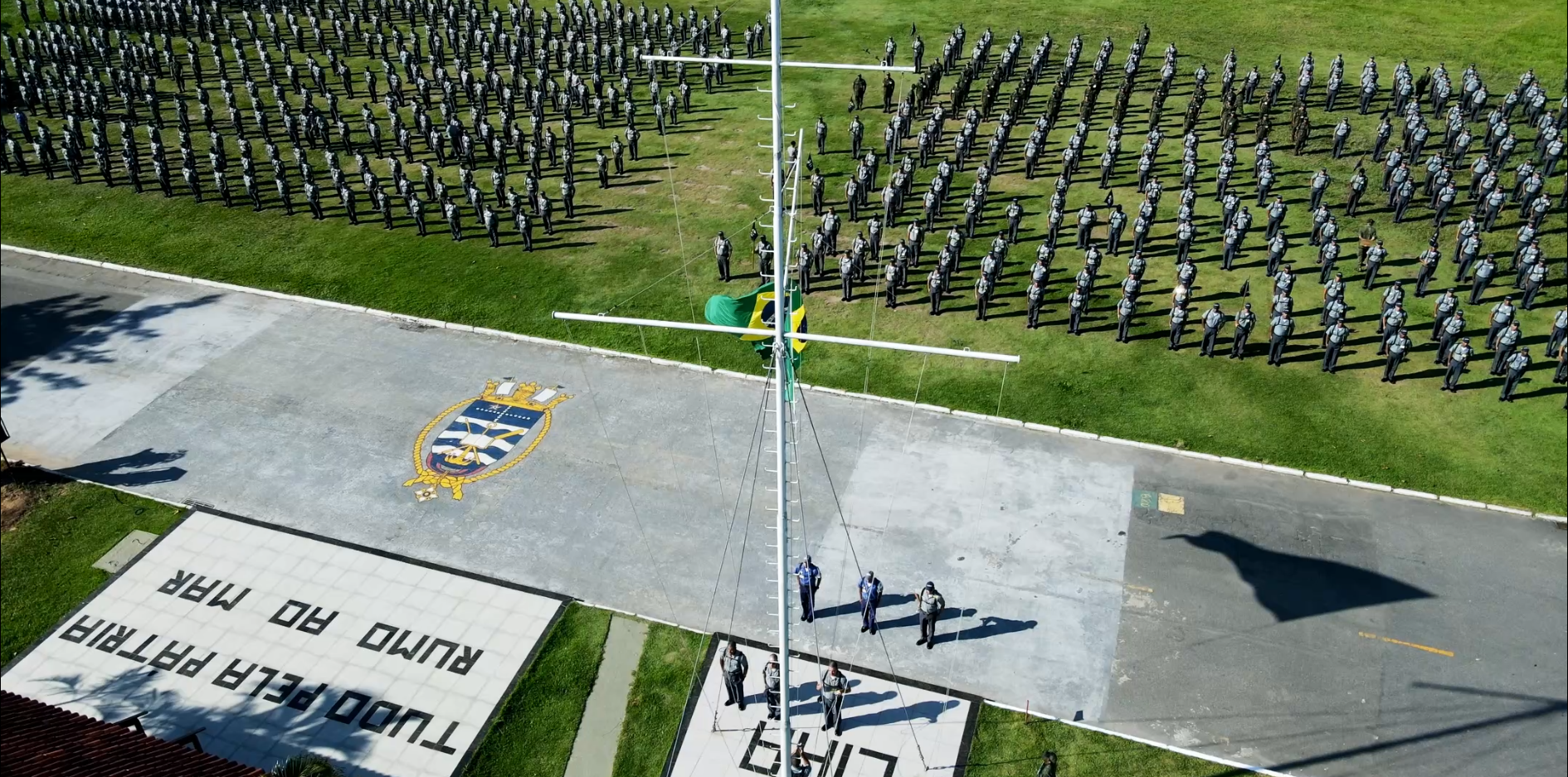
Sailors at the CIAA in 2023

Alexandrino Faria de Alencar was the patron and lent his name to the Admiral Alexandrino Instruction Center (Centro de Instrução Almirante Alexandrino; CIAA), which trains sailors for the Brazilian Navy. The institution was founded on 22 October 1836 and given its current name on 13 May 1993.

== Works published ==
Alexandrino Faria de Alencar published the following works:

- Segredo mecânico do torpedo Witehead (Mechanical secret of the Witehead torpedo) - 1882;
- Relatório ao ministro da Marinha Antônio de Almeida Oliveira sobre a instalação de uma oficina de torpedos no Arsenal de Marinha de Ladário e um plano para a defesa móvel e fixa do rio Paraguai (Report to the Minister of the Navy Antônio de Almeida Oliveira on the installation of a torpedo workshop at the Ladário Navy Arsenal and a plan for the mobile and fixed defense of the Paraguay River) - 1883;
- Aquidaban - Histórico do combate de 16 de abril (Aquidaban - History of the combat of 16 April) - 1895.
