= 1895 in Brazil =

Events in the year 1895 in Brazil.

== Incumbents ==
=== Federal government ===
- President: Prudente de Morais
- Vice-President: Manuel Vitorino

=== Governors ===
- Alagoas: Manuel Gomes Ribeiro (until 16 July), Jose Vieira Peixoto (starting 16 July)
- Amazonas: Eduardo Gonçalves Ribeiro
- Bahia: Rodrigues Lima
- Ceará: Antônio Nogueira Accioli
- Goiás:
  - until 16 July: José Inácio Xavier de Brito
  - 16 July – 18 July: Antônio Caiado
  - from 18 July: Francisco Leopoldo Rodrigues Jardim
- Maranhão:
  - until 2 February: Casimiro Vieira Jr
  - 2 February – 13 August: Manuel Belfort Vieira
  - 13 August – 16 December: Casimiro Vieira Jr
  - from 16 December: Alfredo Martins
- Mato Grosso: Manuel José Murtinho
- Minas Gerais: Bias Fortes
- Pará: Lauro Sodré
- Paraíba: Álvaro Lopes Machado
- Paraná: Francisco Xavier da Silva
- Pernambuco: Alexandre José Barbosa Lima
- Piauí: Coriolano de Carvalho e Silva
- Rio Grande do Norte: Pedro de Albuquerque Maranhão
- Rio Grande do Sul: Júlio de Castilhos
- Santa Catarina: Hercílio Luz
- São Paulo:
- Sergipe:

=== Vice governors ===
- Rio de Janeiro:
- Rio Grande do Norte:
- São Paulo:

== Events ==
- 24 June – Battle of Campo Osório
- 23 August – A peace treaty is signed in Pelotas, bringing an end to the Federalist Revolution.
- 5 November – Japan establishes diplomatic relations with Brazil.

== Births ==
=== June ===
- 14 June: Silvio Lagreca, football manager (died 1966)
- 29 June: João Cabanas, soldier involved in the tenentismo movement (died 1974)

=== July ===
- 26 July: Cassiano Ricardo, journalist, literary critic, and poet (died 1974)

=== October ===
- 31 October: Oswaldo Goeldi, artist (died 1961)

== Deaths ==
- 24 June – Luís Filipe de Saldanha da Gama, rebel admiral
- 29 July – Floriano Peixoto, 2nd President of Brazil (born 1839)
- 25 December – Raul Pompeia, novelist (born 1863)
