= Júlio César de Noronha =

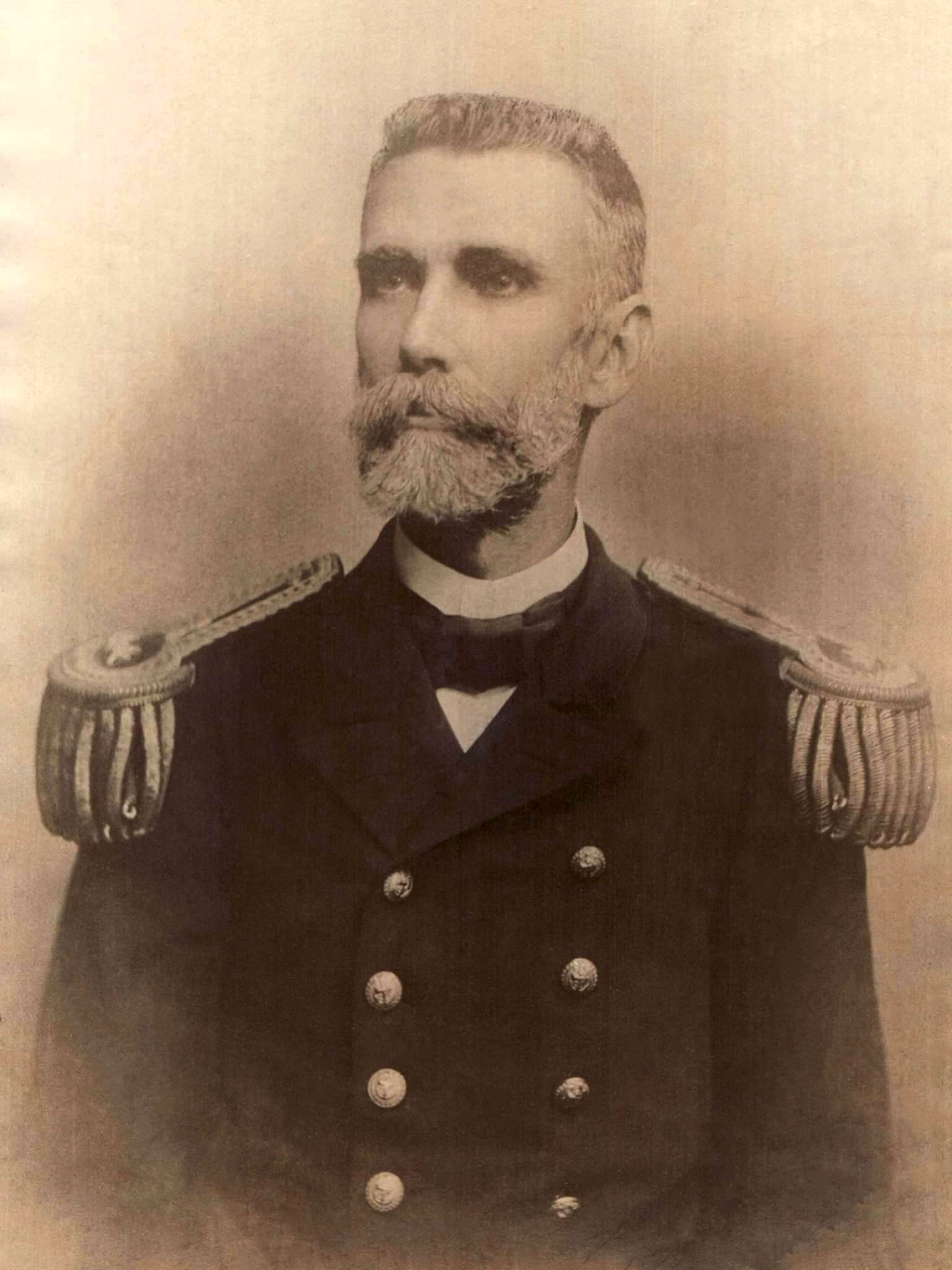
- Admiral Noronha

Minister of the Navy
- In office 15 November 1902 – 15 November 1906
- Appointed by: Rodrigues Alves
- Preceded by: José Pinto da Luz
- Succeeded by: Alexandrino Faria de Alencar

Personal details
- Born: 26 January 1845 Rio de Janeiro, Empire of Brazil
- Died: 11 July 1923 (aged 78) Rio de Janeiro, Brazil

Military service
- Allegiance: Empire of Brazil; Brazil
- Branch/service: Imperial Brazilian Navy; Brazilian Navy
- Rank: Rear admiral
- Battles/wars: Paraguayan War; South American dreadnought race

Júlio César de Noronha (26 January 1845 – 11 September 1923) was Brazil's Minister of the Navy from 1902 to 1906. Under his direction, the country ordered a slate of warships from the United Kingdom that included three battleships, three armored cruisers, six destroyers, twelve torpedo boats, three submarines, a collier, and a training ship. After his departure, the order was canceled by the subsequent Minister of the Navy Alexandrino Faria de Alencar in favor of three dreadnoughts, three scout cruisers, and a plethora of smaller ships.

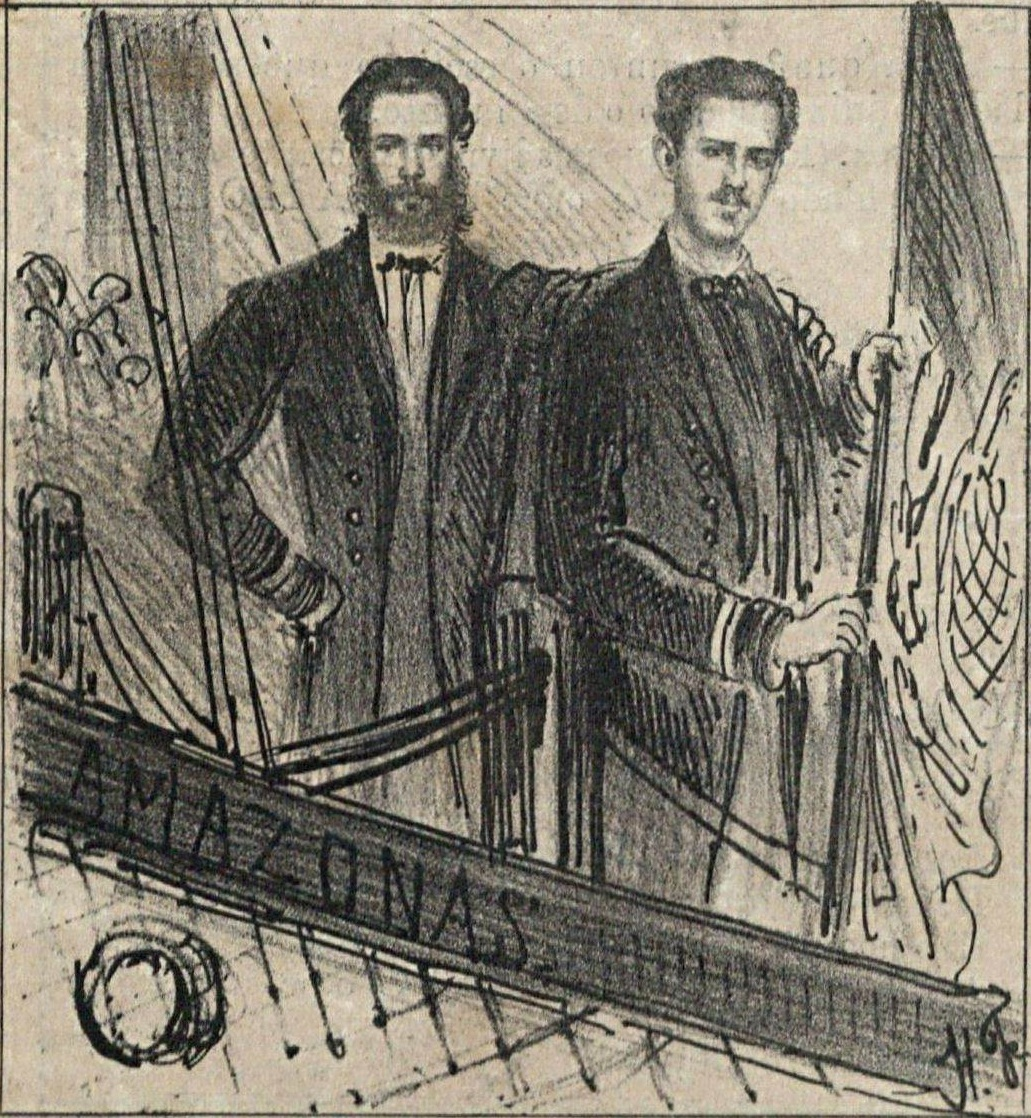
Then-second lieutenant Júlio César de Noronha during the Paraguayan War (right), 1865

Earlier in Noronha's career, he commanded the corvette Vital de Oliveira. Under his command, the ship circumnavigated the world from 19 November 1879 to 21 January 1881. It was the first Brazilian ship to ever complete this feat.

== See also ==
- South American dreadnought race
- Isaías de Noronha
