= Brazilian Naval Revolts =

Series of mutinies in the Brazilian Navy

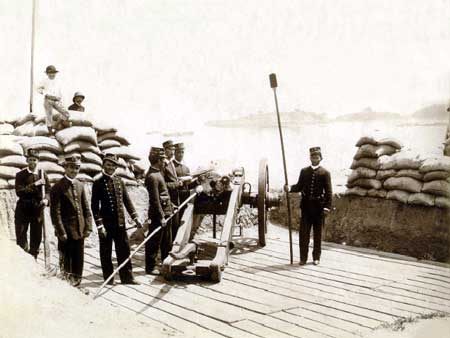
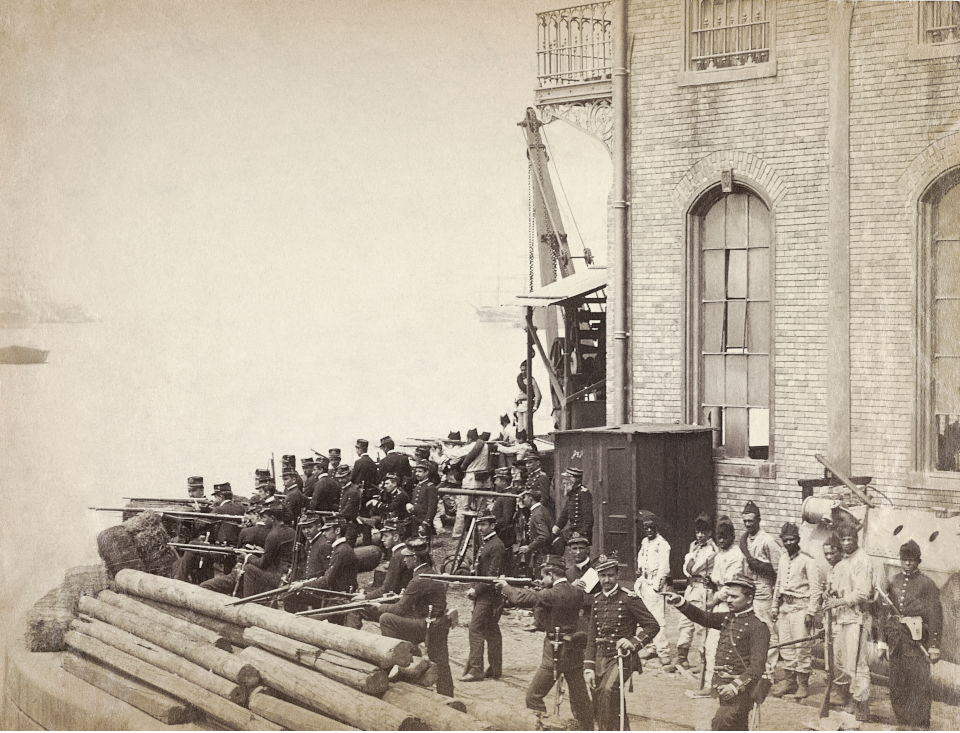
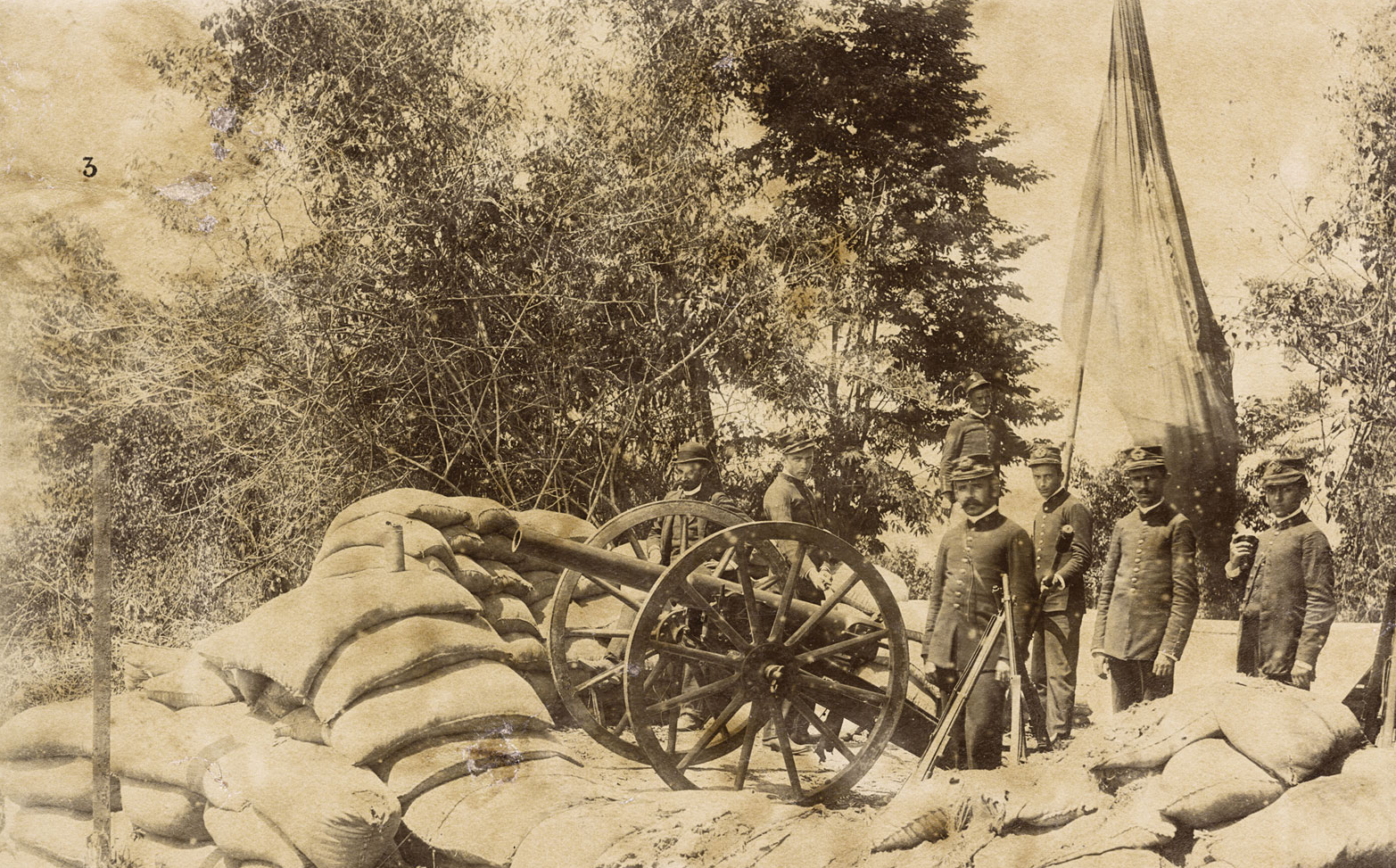
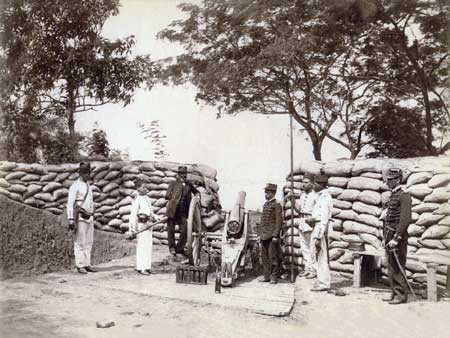
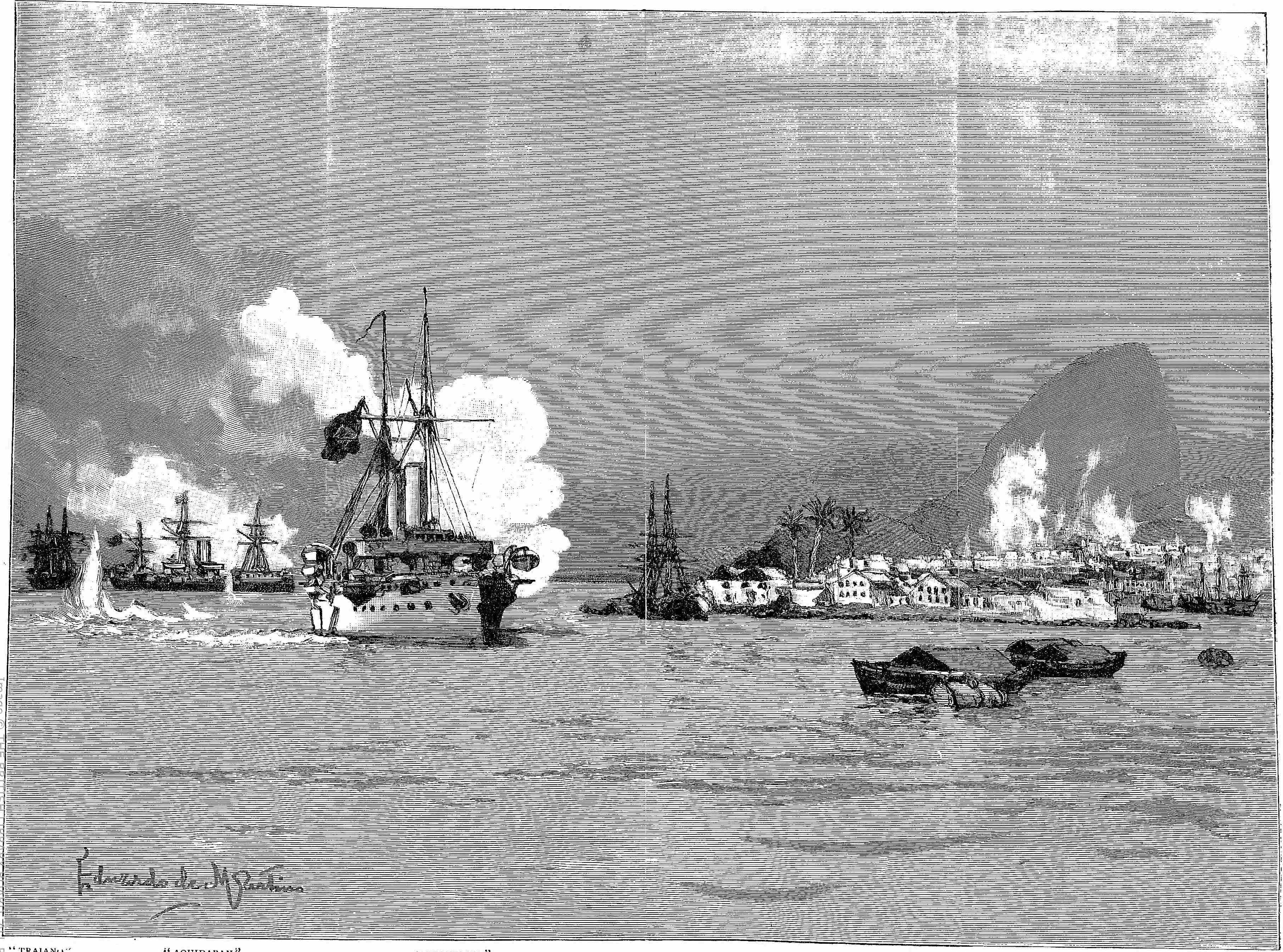
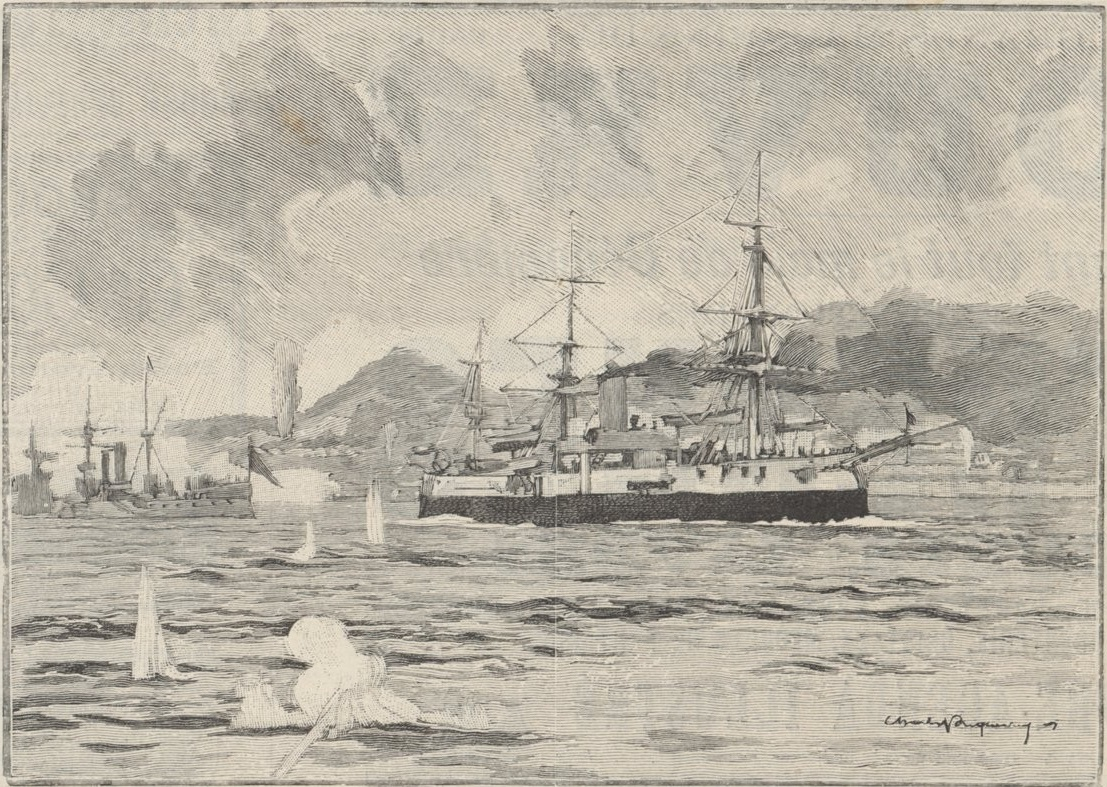
| Date | 1891 (first); 1893–1894 (second) |
| Location | Rio de Janeiro, Brazil |
| Result | Government victory |

Belligerents
| (Brazil) Brazil; Support: United States | Navy mutineers |

Commanders and leaders
| (Brazil) Deodoro da Fonseca; (Brazil) Floriano Peixoto; (Brazil) Hermes da Fonseca; (Brazil) Jerônimo Gonçalves; (Brazil) Moreira César; (Brazil) José Jardim; (United States) Andrew E. K. Benham; (United States) Willard H. Brownson | Custódio de Melo; Saldanha da Gama; Eduardo Wandenkolk |

Strength
| 10 forts (Army control) Loyalist Navy Squad: 2 cruisers 1 torpedo-boat destroyer 6 torpedo boats 2 monitors 4 auxiliary cruisers 2 gunboats | 1 fort (rebel control) Rebel Navy Squad: 2 coastal battleships 4 cruisers 2 monitor 1 gunboat 7 torpedo boats 9 auxiliary cruisers |

Casualties and losses
| 4 ships sunk Several fortifications destroyed or severely damaged | 12 ships sunk Large |

The Brazilian Naval Revolts (Portuguese: Revoltas da Armada, lit. 'Navy's Revolt') were armed mutinies promoted mainly by admirals Custódio José de Melo and Saldanha da Gama and their fleet of rebel Brazilian navy ships against the claimed unconstitutional staying in power of president Floriano Peixoto.

The revolts had a number of causes: "personal animosities in the ruling elite; friction in federal-state relations and between the president and Congress; militarism; government extravagance; army navy rivalry; and some lingering monarchical sentiments following the overthrow of the empire in 1889."

The United States supported the incumbent government against the insurgents.

== First revolt ==
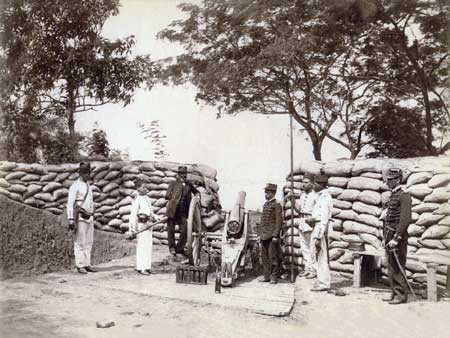
Brazilian Army fortification in Guanabara Bay, 1894

In November 1891, President Marshal Deodoro da Fonseca, amid a political crisis compounded by the effects of an economic crisis, in flagrant violation of the new constitution, decided to "solve" the political crisis by ordering the closure of Congress, supported mainly by the Paulista oligarchy. The Navy, still resentful of the circumstances and outcomes of the coup that had put an end to the monarchy in Brazil, under the leadership of admiral Custódio José de Melo, rose up and threatened to bombard the city of Rio de Janeiro, then the capital of Brazil. To avoid a civil war, marshal Deodoro resigned the presidency in 23 November. With the resignation of Deodoro, after just nine months from the beginning of his administration, vice president Floriano Peixoto took office. The 1891 Constitution, however, provided for a new election if the presidency or vice-presidency became vacant sooner than two years in office. The opposition then accused Floriano of staying as head of the nation illegally.

== Second revolt ==
The second revolt started in March 1892, when thirteen generals sent a letter and manifesto to the President Marshal Floriano Peixoto. This document demanded new elections be called to fulfill the constitutional provision and ensure internal tranquility in the nation. Floriano harshly suppressed the movement, ordering the arrest of their leaders. Thus, not legally solved, the political tensions increased. The revolt broke out in September 1893 at Rio de Janeiro, and was suppressed only in March 1894 after a long blockade of the city.

With many of the Brazilian Navy's most powerful ships either in the hands of the rebels or under repair, the Brazilian government had to improvise a new fleet to battle the rebel fleet. The "paper fleet", as it was called, had to face off against a mutiny that had overtaken most of the powerful ships of the original navy. Local bloody conflicts in some regions of Brazil ensued. The navy's mutiny off Rio de Janeiro, in the Guanabara Bay, was also a challenge, and became linked to the Federalist Revolution in southern Brazil.

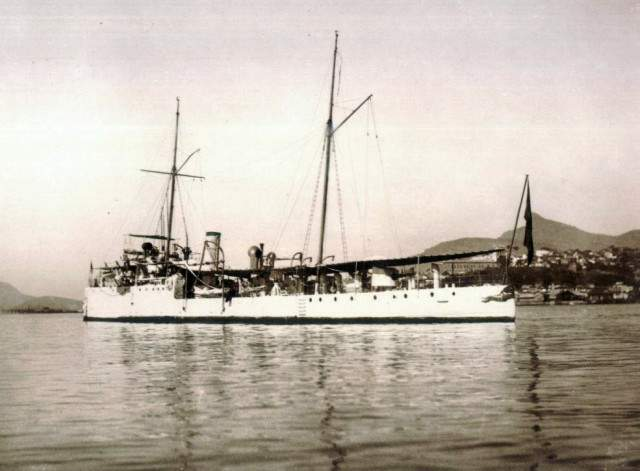
Loyalist torpedo-boat destroyer Gustavo Sampaio

The revolt included the powerful battleship Aquidabã and a collection of small ironclads, modern cruisers and older wood "cruiser" or steam frigate type ships. Two of the navy's major ships were overseas and supposedly away from the conflict: the battleship Riachuelo was under repairs in France, and the corvette Barroso was on a round-the world training voyage (during which she sank). This did not leave the government with much left to challenge the mutineers, who could have controlled the seas and influenced the concurrent conflicts on land.

The government basically bought itself a new naval force on the open market, of small and sometimes unusual ships including torpedo gunboats, various medium and small torpedo boats, small armed yachts, and a transport converted to carry a Zalinski dynamite gun (a pneumatic gun launching a dynamite charge of massive explosive force and marginal accuracy). Such improvised stocking up was common at that time: the US pressed a similar mix of ships into action to supplement its fleet in the 1898 war with Spain (or to buy them before Spain could), and Japan also scrambled to purchase available ships for its conflict with Russia in 1904–5. In this case, however, the new fleet was dedicated to confronting the original navy of the same country.

=== Details of conflict ===
On 13 September, the fortresses in Rio de Janeiro, held by the Army, began to be bombarded. The rebel forces' fleet consisted of navy vessels and civilian vessels of Brazilian and foreign companies.

The rebels were the majority in the Navy, but faced strong opposition in the Army, where thousands of young soldiers joined the battalions that supported president Floriano Peixoto. State elites, especially in São Paulo, were also in favor of Floriano.

At the same time, in southern Brazil, the Federalist Revolution against the government was taking place, a dispute between the federalists (nicknamed maragatos) and republicans (nicknamed pica-paus), the latter supported by president Floriano. The city of Desterro, as the capital of Santa Catarina state was then called, was dominated by the rebels. At dawn on 1 December, admiral Custódio de Melo, in the Aquidabã, followed by the República and auxiliary cruisers, went south to join forces with the federalists.

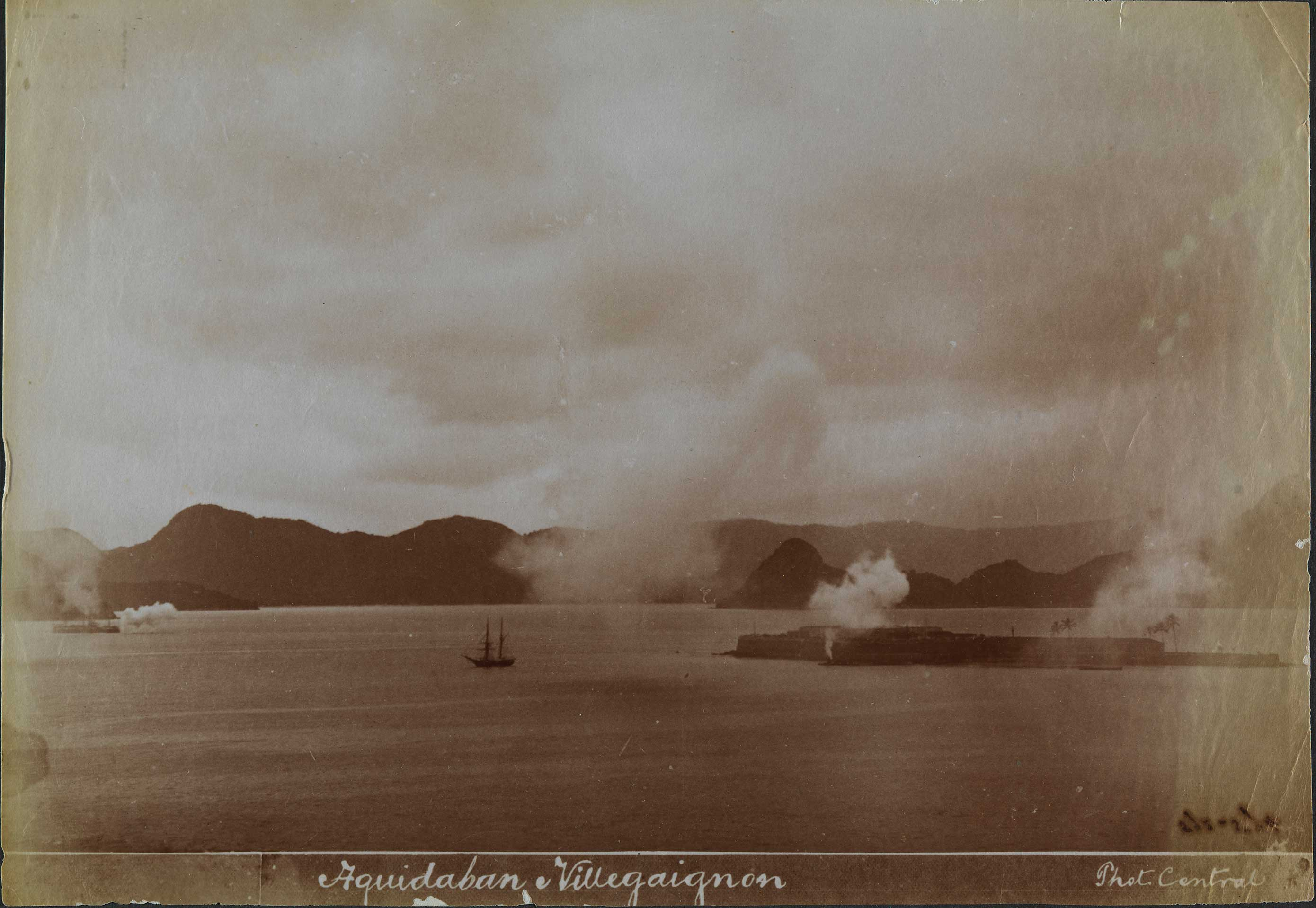
Rare photo: Artillery fire exchange between the Rebel Battleship Aquidabã and the Army Fortress Villegaignon during the Battle of Guanabara Bay.

On 7 December, rear admiral Luis Filipe Saldanha da Gama, then director of the Naval School, joined the movement, taking over the rebels in Rio de Janeiro, beginning the second phase of the Navy Revolt. By this time, the rebels had little ammunition and no food. The São José Fortress, on Cobras Island, was practically destroyed by the loyalist troops. On 9 February 1894, the rebels, under the command of Saldanha da Gama, landed at Ponta da Armação, in the city of Niterói, but were defeated. They were also defeated in Governador Island.

Niterói, which was the capital of the state of Rio de Janeiro, had its seven forts bombed. On 20 February 1894, the seat of government was then moved to Petrópolis, a mountain town beyond the reach of the Navy guns. Niterói would not return to host the capital in 1903.

The federal government had acquired warships, which were dubbed the "paper fleet". The command of this squadron was given to admiral Jerônimo Gonçalves, a veteran of the Paraguayan War. In March 1894, with the support of the Army and the Republican Party of São Paulo (PRP), the Navy Revolt was stifled. The rebels took refuge in the Portuguese ships Mindelo and Afonso de Albuquerque, ending the second phase of the revolt.

The Federalist Revolution continued in the south, where Saldanha da Gama and his men were still leading troops against the government. Custódio de Melo had taken the port of Paranaguá and was united with the federalist leader Gumercindo Saraiva. They took the city of Lapa and the government troops moved south. On 16 April 1894, the rebel battleship Aquidabã was torpedoed in Santa Catarina by the torpedo-boat destroyer Gustavo Sampaio, which was commanded by lieutenant Altino Flávio de Miranda Correia.

In the República cruiser, Custódio de Melo, commanding four merchant ships and two thousand men, unsuccessfully tried to land in the city of Rio Grande. He was defeated by troops loyal to the state governor Júlio de Castilhos. The navy rebels were defeated. Custódio took refuge in Argentina, where he delivered the ships. According to historian Helio Silva, the end of the third and final phase of the Armada Revolt happened with the death of Saldanha da Gama, on 25 June 1895, in the Battle of Campo Osório, in Rio Grande do Sul.

=== Photo gallery ===
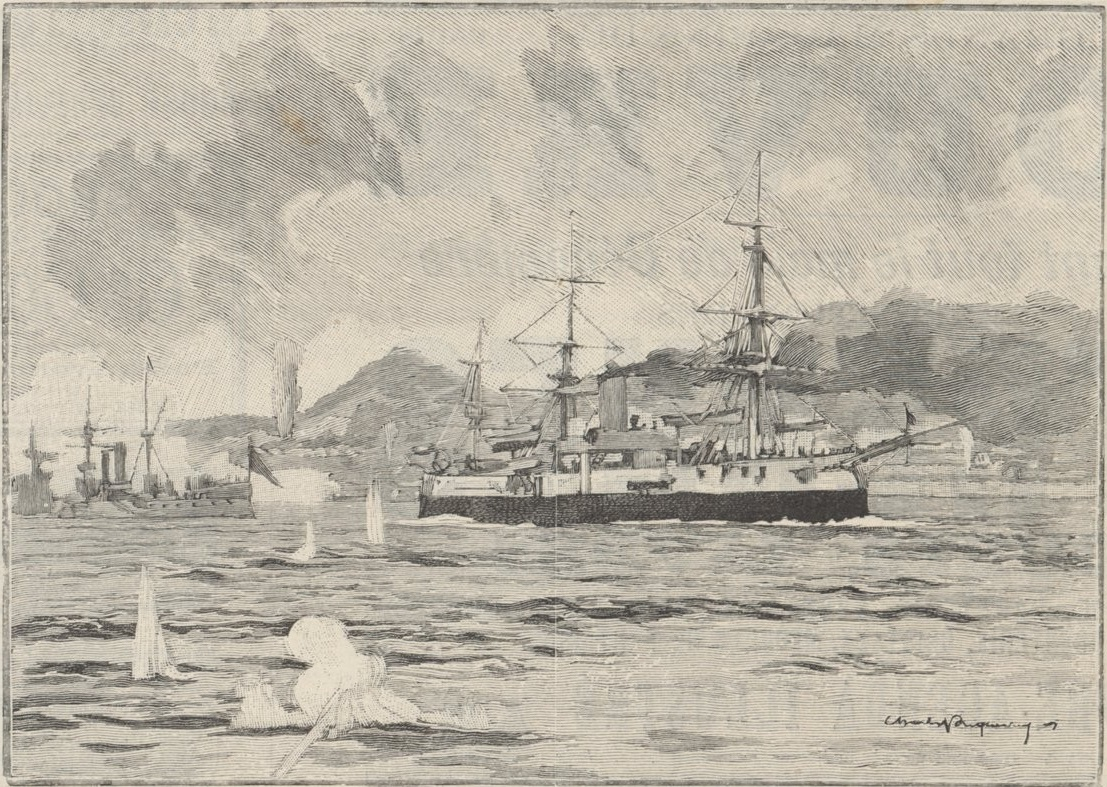
Rebel battleship Aquidaban bombarding the forts of Rio de Janeiro (drawing of Fouqueray, according to a photography, published in Le Monde Illustré, nº 1.916, 1893.).

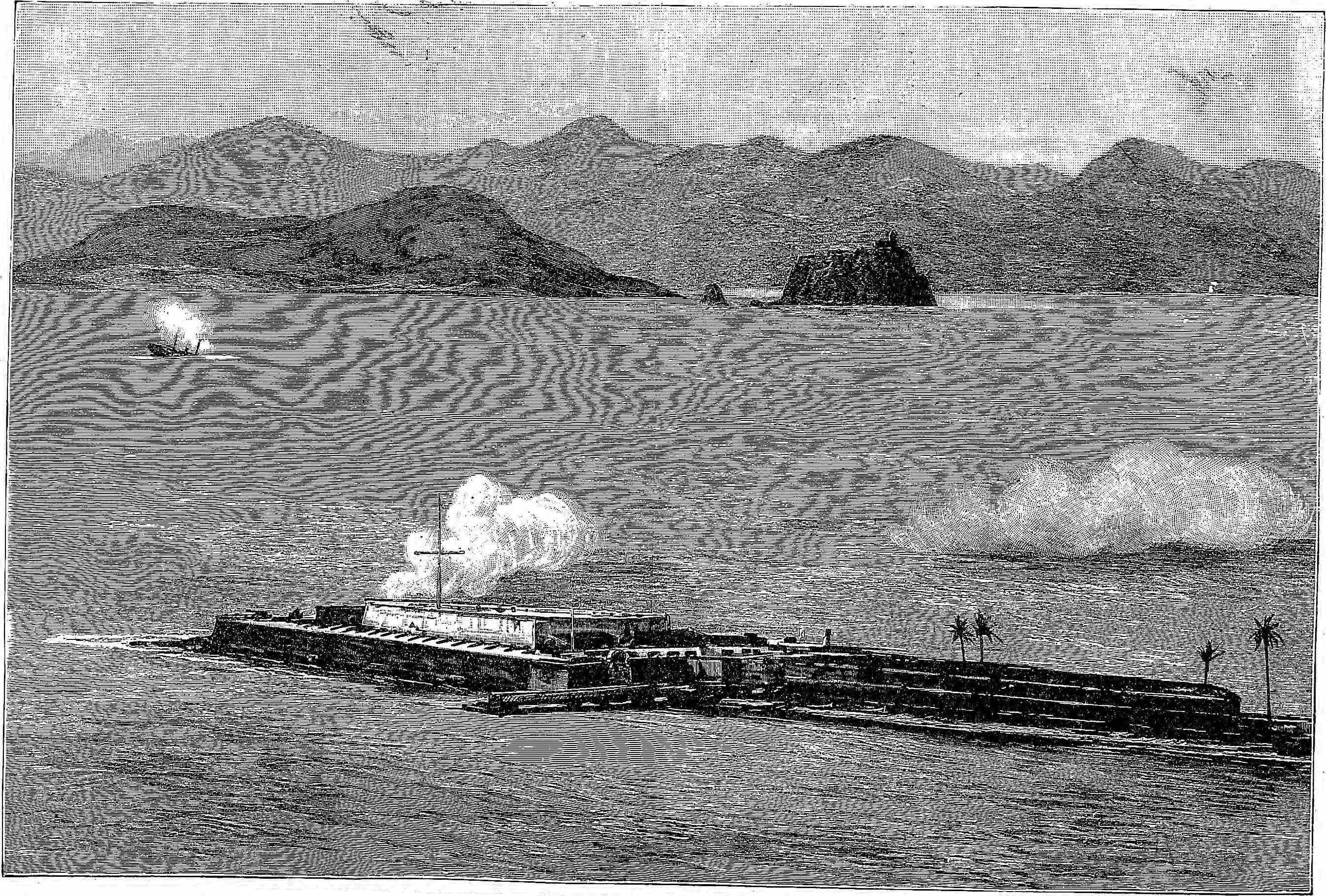
Fort Villegaignon, in possession of the rebel forces: the sinking vessel is the monitor Javary.

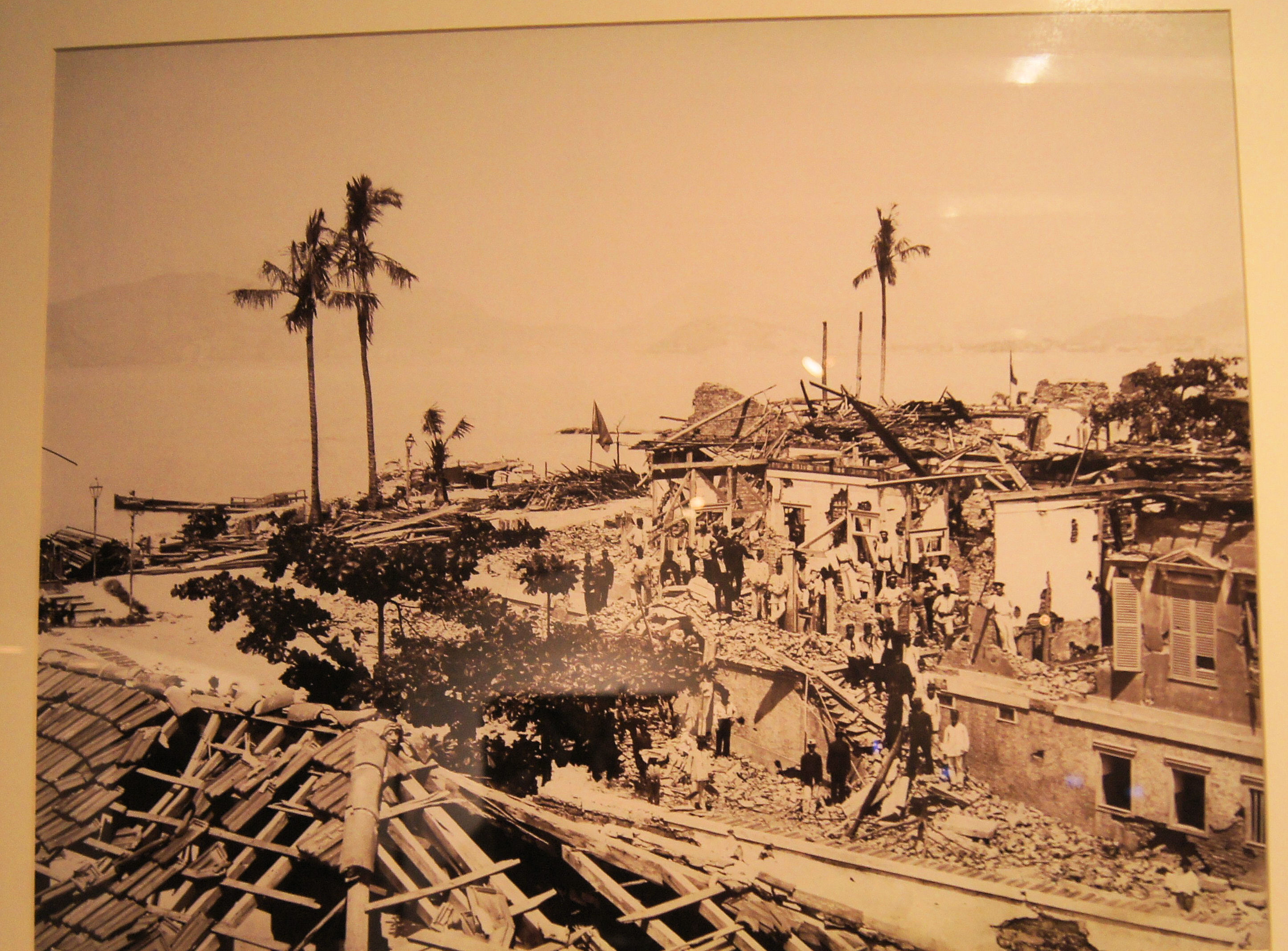
Fortress of Villegaignon after loyalist bombardment during the Battle of Guanabara Bay.

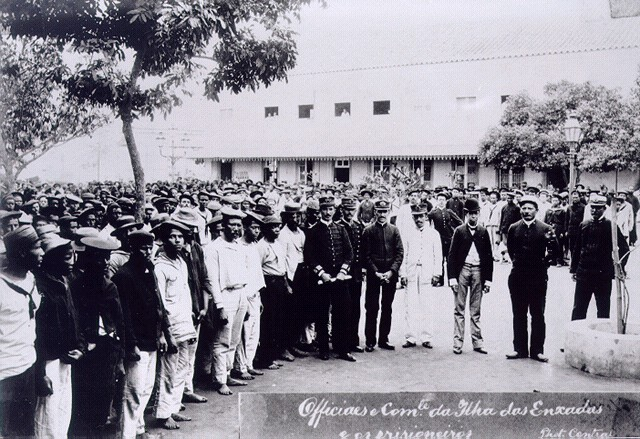
Prisoners taken during the Revolta da Armada.

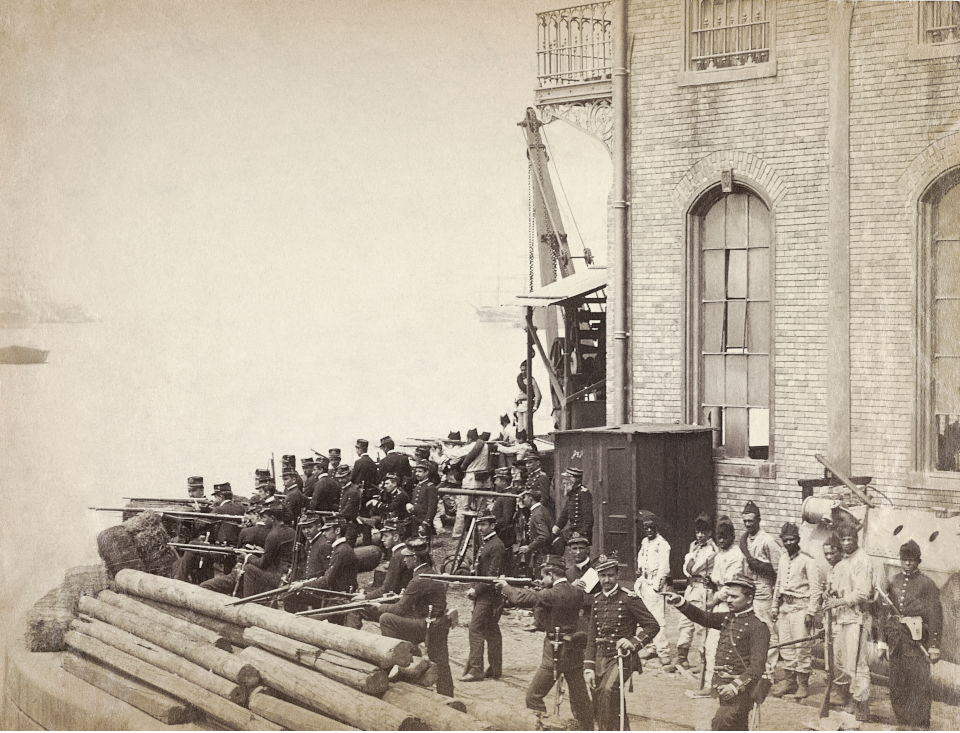
Army infantry and artillery troops defending the port area of Rio de Janeiro.

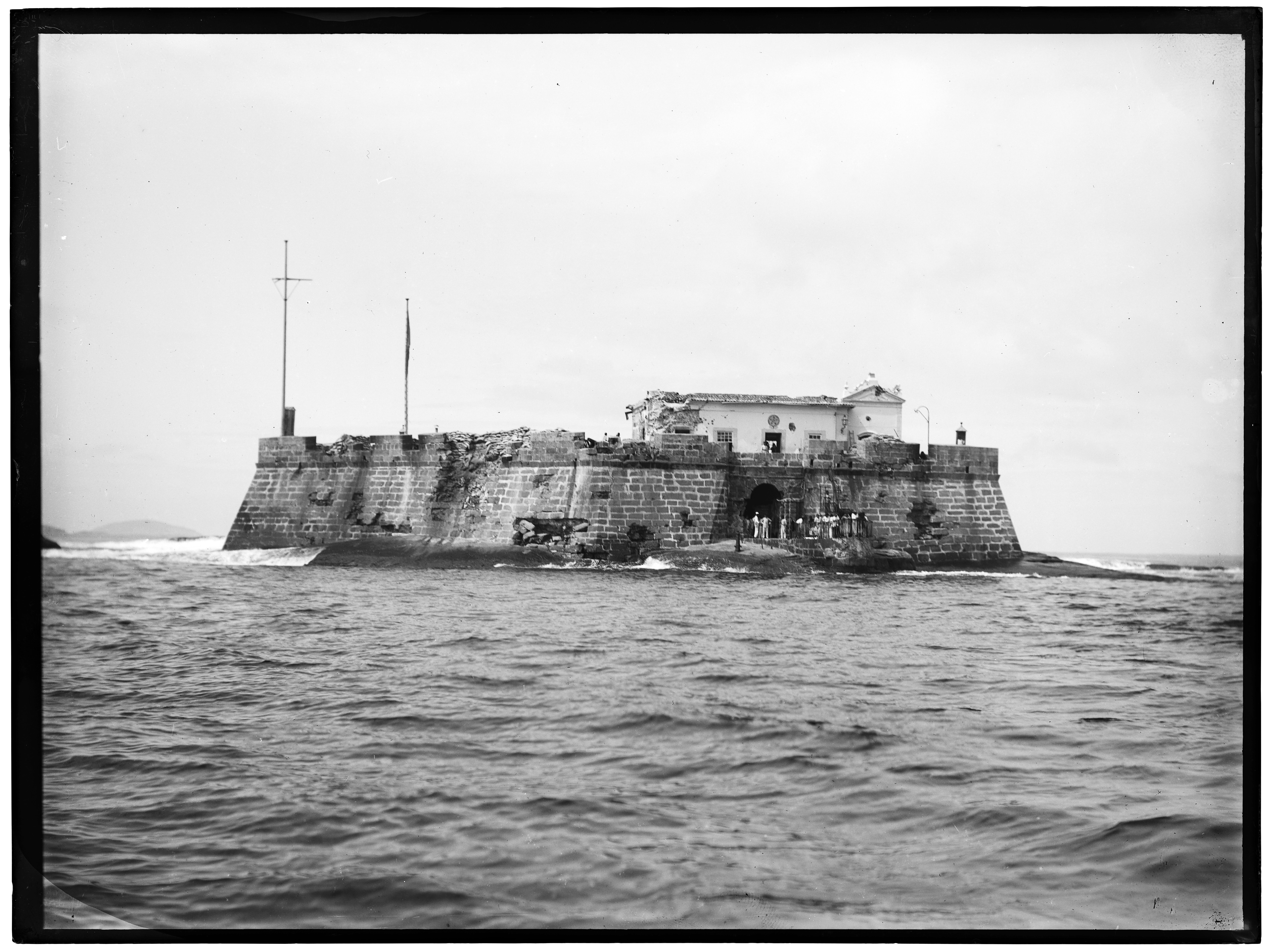
Fortress of Laje after rebel bombardment.

=== Main ships involved in the conflict ===
==== Rebel Squad ====
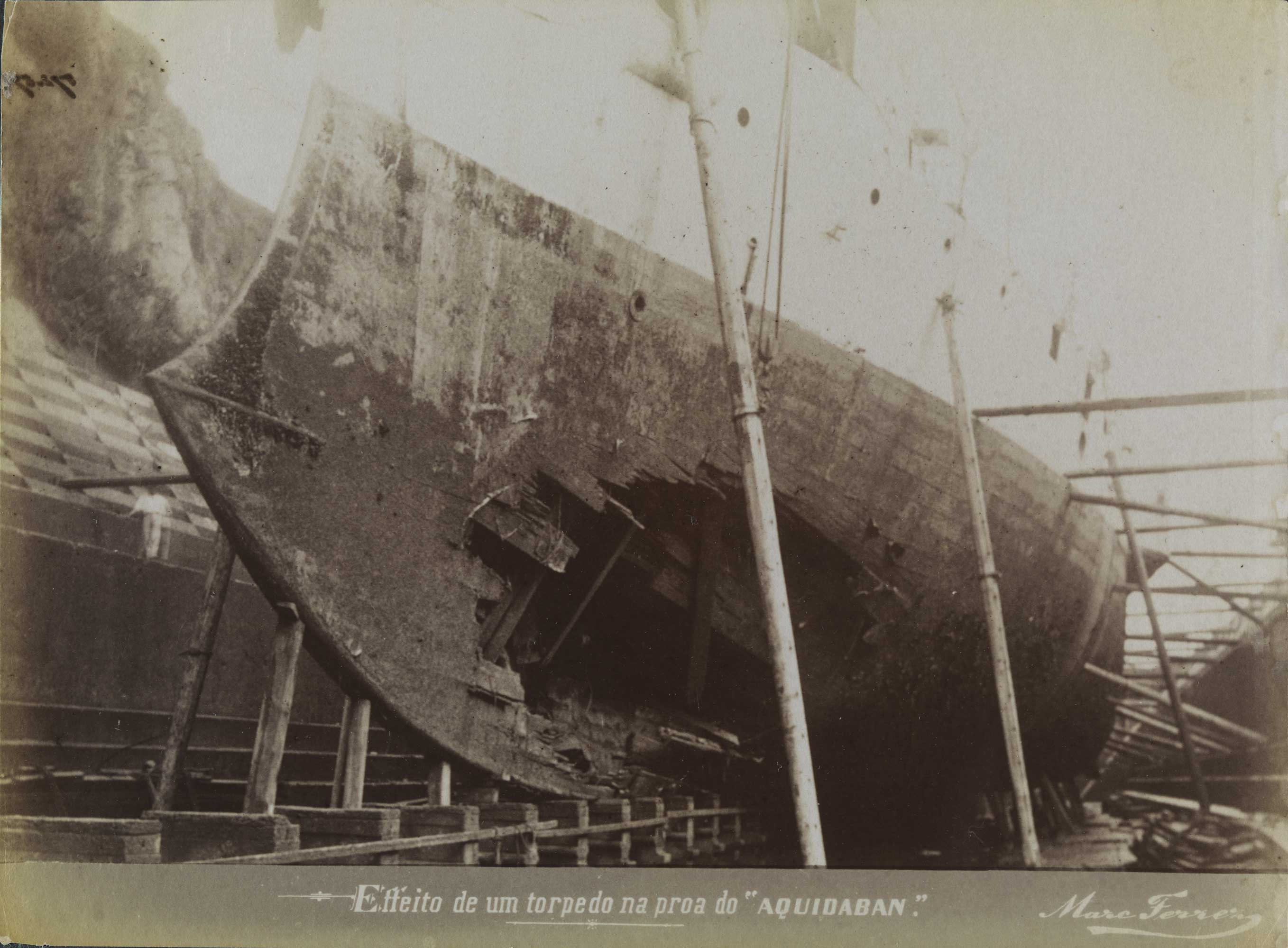
Severe torpedo damage to Aquidabã's bow

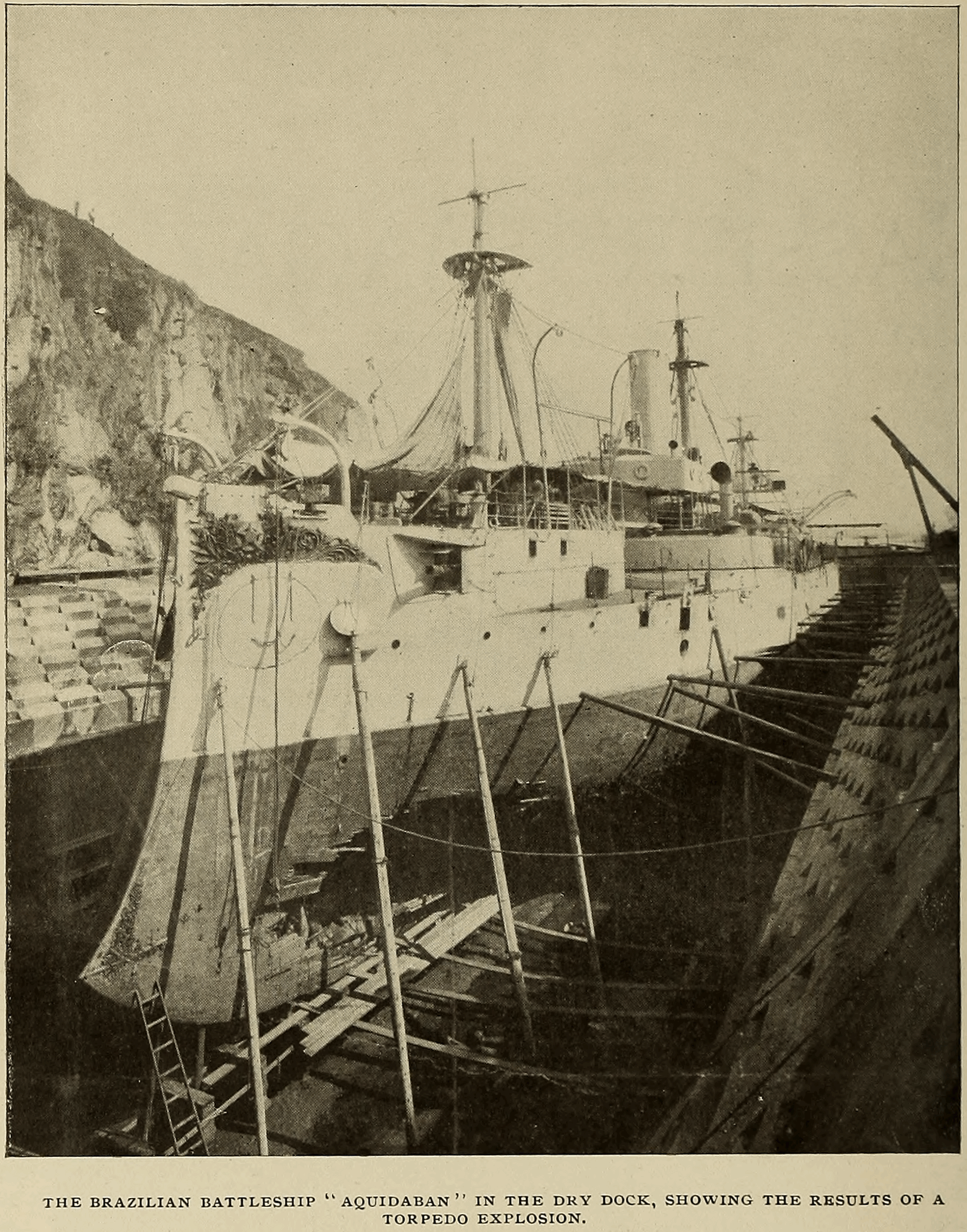
Post-conflict recovery of the Aquidabã in 1897.

- Battleship Aquidabã - Seriously damaged (disabled until the end of the conflict) by torpedo attack in combat against destroyer Gustavo de Sampaio in the Battle of Anhatomirim.
- Armored frigate Sete de Setembro - Sunk and burned during the Battle of Guanabara Bay.
- Protected cruiser Tamandaré
- Protected cruiser República
- Cruiser Trajano
- Gunboat Marajó - Sunk after fire during the Battle of Guanabara Bay.
- Monitor Alagoas
- Monitor Javary - Sunk by coastal artillery (Fortress São João) during the Battle of Guanabara Bay.
- Torpedoboat Marcílio Dias
- Torpedoboat Iguatemi
- Torpedoboat Araguari
- Auxiliary cruiser Pereira da Cunha - Sunk by coastal artillery (Fort Gragoatá) after explosion of its ammunition stockpile, killing all crew, Battle of Ponta da Armação (Niterói).
- Transport Ship Madeira - Sunk by coastal artillery (Fort Gragoatá) during the Battle of Ponta da Armação (Niterói).
- Transport Ship Palas - Was wrecked in Itajai (Santa Catarina, Brazil) at the mouth of the Itajaí-Açu River 25 October 1893., not sunk after collision with a rock in Battle of Anhatomirim, April, 1894.

==== Loyalist Squad ====
- Cruiser Tiradentes
- Cruiser Parnaiba
- Destroyer Gustavo Sampaio
- Monitor Solimões
- Gunboat Cananéia - Sunk by rebel Cruiser República in combat, southern Brazil.
- Gunboat Piratini - Sunk in combat against Rebel Squad in Salvador, Bahia.
- Auxiliary cruiser Nictheroy
- Torpedoboat Pedro Ivo
- Torpedoboat Pedro Affonso
- Torpedoboat Silvado
- Torpedoboat Bento Gonçalves - Seriously damaged in combat against the rebel battleship Aquidabã in Battle of Anhatomirim.
- Torpedoboat Sabino Vieira
- Torpedoboat Tamborim
- Transport ship Itaipu

== See also ==
- Brazilian Navy
- Rebellions and revolutions in Brazil
- Captain Suresh Biswas
