= Brazilian battleship Aquidabã =

Ironclad battleship (1885–1906)

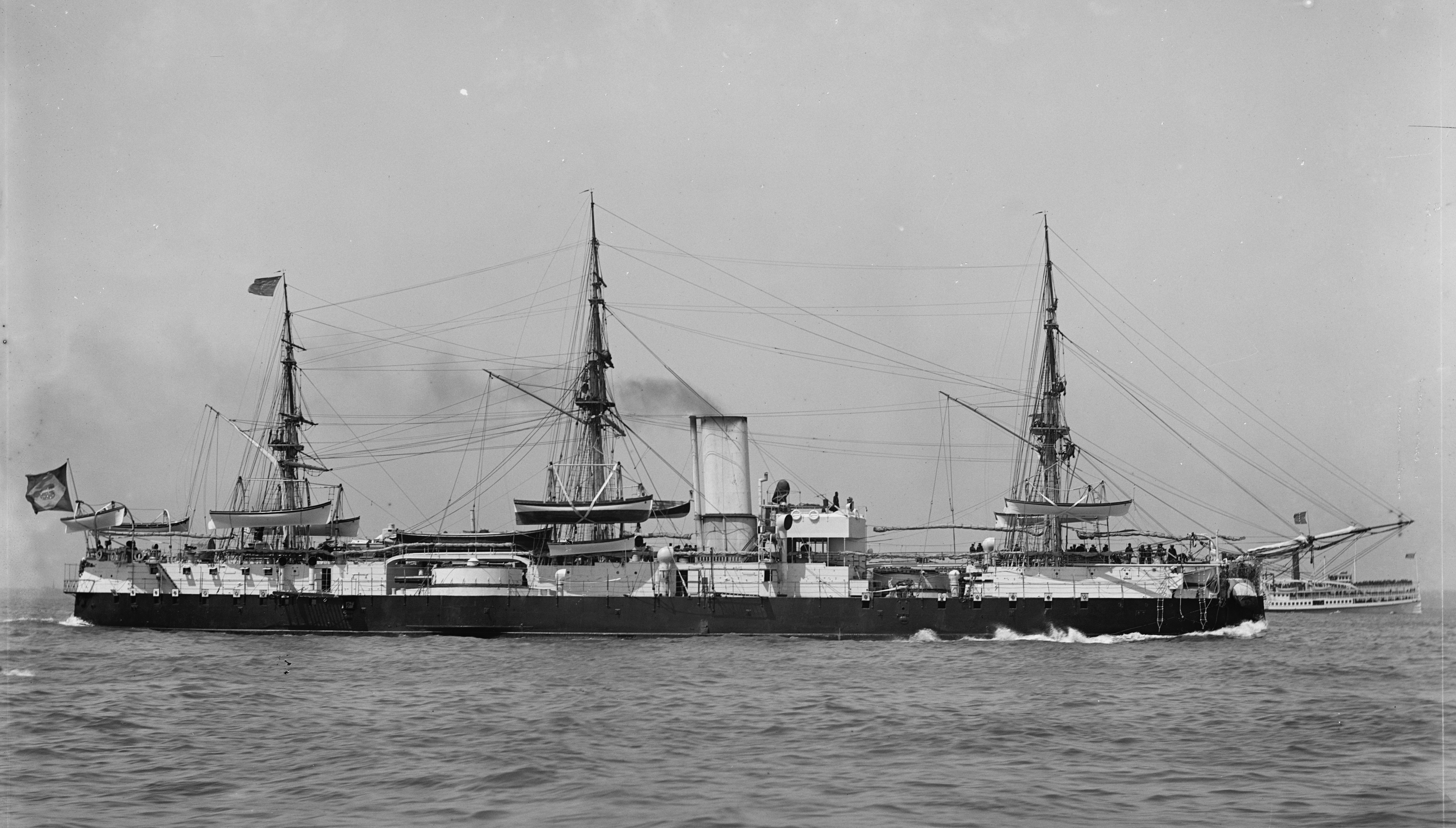
- Aquidabã off US coast, probably in 1893

History

Empire of Brazil
- Name: Aquidabã
- Namesake: Aquidabán River
- Builder: Samuda Brothers, Cubitt Town, London
- Launched: 17 January 1885
- Completed: 1887
- Nickname(s): Steel Lion
- Fate: Sank 21 January 1906 after powder magazine exploded

General characteristics
- Type: Ironclad warship
- Displacement: 4,921 tonnes (4,843 long tons)
- Length: 280.2 ft (85.4 m)
- Beam: 52.03 ft (15.86 m)
- Draft: 18 ft 4 in (5.59 m)
- Installed power: 8 × cylindrical boilers; 6,500 ihp (4,800 kW)
- Propulsion: 2 × shafts; 2 × compound-expansion steam engines
- Speed: 15.8 knots (29.3 km/h; 18.2 mph)
- Range: 4,500 nautical miles (8,300 km) at 10 knots (19 km/h; 12 mph)
- Complement: 277
- Armament: 2 × twin 9.2 in (234 mm) guns; 4 × single 5.5 in (140 mm) guns; 13 × single 1 pounder guns; 5 × 14 in (356 mm) torpedo tubes
- Armor: Waterline belt: 7–11 in (178–279 mm); Deck: 2 in (51 mm); Gun turrets: 10 in (254 mm)

Aquidabã (Portuguese: [ɐkidaˈbɐ̃]), anglicized to Aquidaban, was a Brazilian ironclad battleship built in the mid-1880s. The ship participated in two naval revolts; during the second she was sunk by a government torpedo boat. After being refloated, Aquidabã was sent to (Germany) for repairs and modernization. During a routine cruise in 1906, the ship's ammunition magazines exploded, which caused the vessel to sink rapidly with a great loss of life.

== Design ==
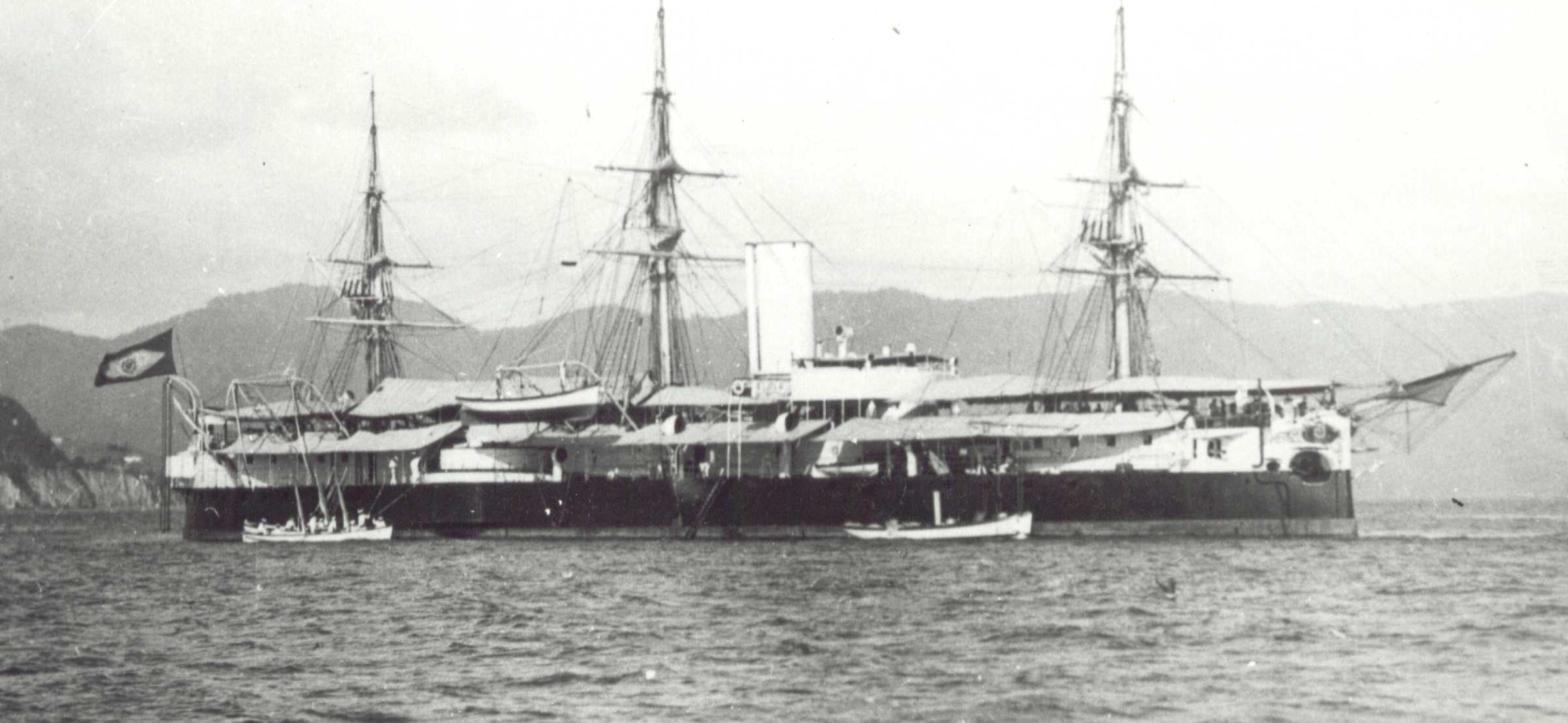
Aquidabã seen prior to 1898, as the multiple masts have not been replaced yet

Aquidabã was 280 ft (85.3 m) long, had a beam of 52 ft (15.8 m), and had a draft of 18 ft 4 in (5.6 m). The ship displaced 4,921 long tons (5,000 t) and had a crew of 277 officers and enlisted men. She was powered by a pair of compound-expansion steam engines, each driving one propeller shaft using steam provided by eight cylindrical boilers; this produced up to 6,500 indicated horsepower (4,800 kW) for a top speed of 15.8 kn (29.3 km/h; 18.2 mph). Fuel stores were initially 300 t (300 long tons; 330 short tons), though after refits this was increased to 800 t (790 long tons; 880 short tons).

Aquidabã's main armament consisted of four 9.2-inch (234 mm) guns mounted in two twin gun turrets, each of which was placed off the centerline, en echelon, with the forward turret offset to port and the aft turret to starboard. Secondary weapons included four 5.5-inch (140 mm) guns, two fore and two aft, and thirteen 1-pounder guns, all on single mounts. The ship was also equipped with five 14 in (356 mm) torpedo tubes; three were above water, while the remaining two were below the waterline. The ship was equipped with compound armor. The armored belt was 11 in (279 mm) thick in the central portion of the ship, where the most critical parts of the ship were located. This included the propulsion machinery spaces and ammunition magazines. At the ends of the ship, the thickness was reduced to 7 in (178 mm). The main-battery turrets were protected with 10 in (254 mm) worth of armor, as was the conning tower.

== Construction and career ==
Aquidabã was built in England by Samuda Brothers for £345,000 pounds sterling; her keel was laid on 18 June 1883, and she was launched on 17 January 1885. (Note: Though the Brazilian Navy's official history of the ship gives a keel laying date of May 1883, both Conway's All the World's Fighting Ships 1860–1905 and the Miramar Ship Index agree on 18 June.) The ship was a slightly smaller version of the earlier battleship Riachuelo, being shorter, having a lighter draft, and being equipped with only one funnel. After undergoing gunnery trials on 14 August, she sailed from England on 16 December, calling upon Lisbon and Bahia before reaching her ultimate destination of Rio de Janeiro on 29 January 1886.

=== Rebellions ===
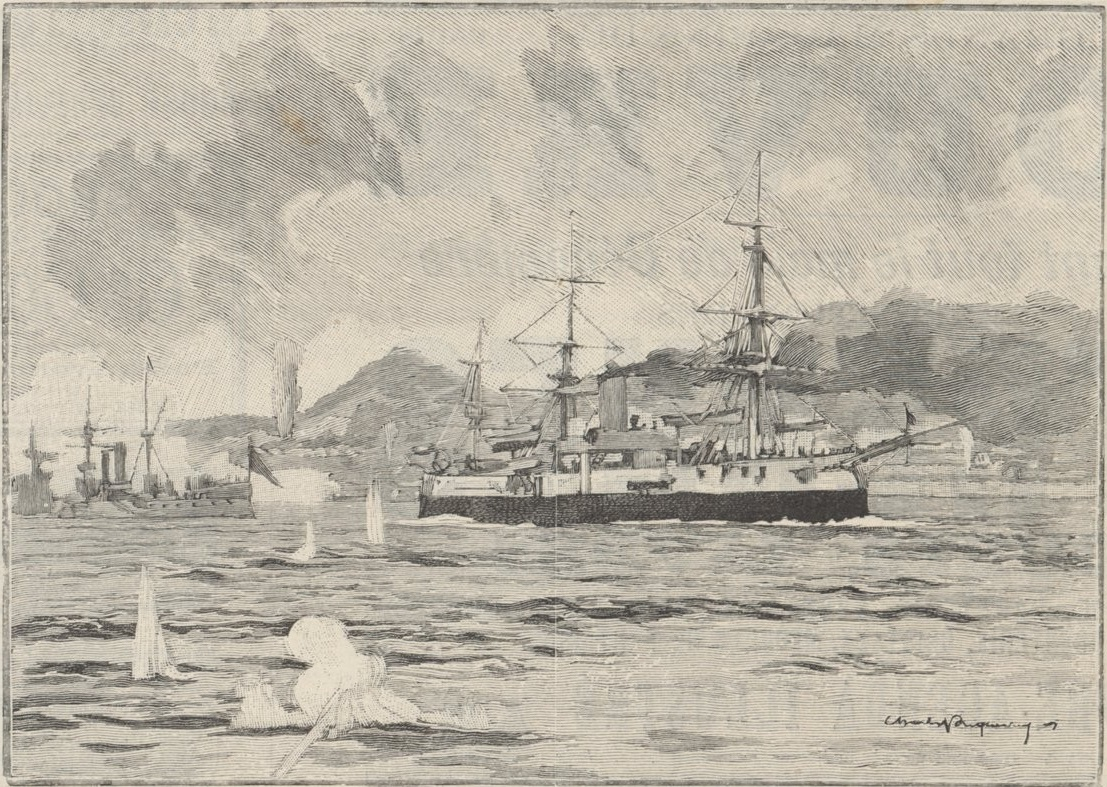
Aquidabã bombarding the forts of Rio de Janeiro (drawing of Fouqueray, according to a photography, published in Le Monde Illustré, nº 1.916, 1893).

Aquidabã was part of a rebellion which started on 23 November 1891, headed by Rear Admiral Custódio José de Melo. Two years later (1893), she voyaged to the United States to take part in the International Naval Review. In that same year, she was the flagship of the Revolta da Armada (Revolt of the Navy), once again led by de Melo. On 16 April 1894, Aquidabã was anchored off the coast of Santa Catarina, near the Fortress of Anhatomirim. Early in the morning, the first class torpedo boat Gustavo Sampaio, accompanied by three other torpedo boats, attacked Aquidabã; two torpedoes connected with the battleship and she sank in shallow water, inflicting only light damage in return.

The battle, which marked the first use of torpedoes by the Brazilian military, signaled the end of the revolution in Brazil. The members of the revolutionary government based in Desterro, in the island of Santa Catarina, fled to the continent; loyalist Colonel Antônio Moreira César would later regain control of the city. Refloated in June 1894 by government forces, Aquidabã was quickly renamed to first Dezesseis de Abril (English: 16 April), then Vinte e Quatro de Maio (English: 24 May) due to anger over the ship rebelling twice in four years. Partially repaired, the ship was brought to Stettin, Germany, and Elswick, England for a full repair and refitting. The work lasted from 1897 to 1898, and included the installation of two heavy fighting masts.

=== Later career ===
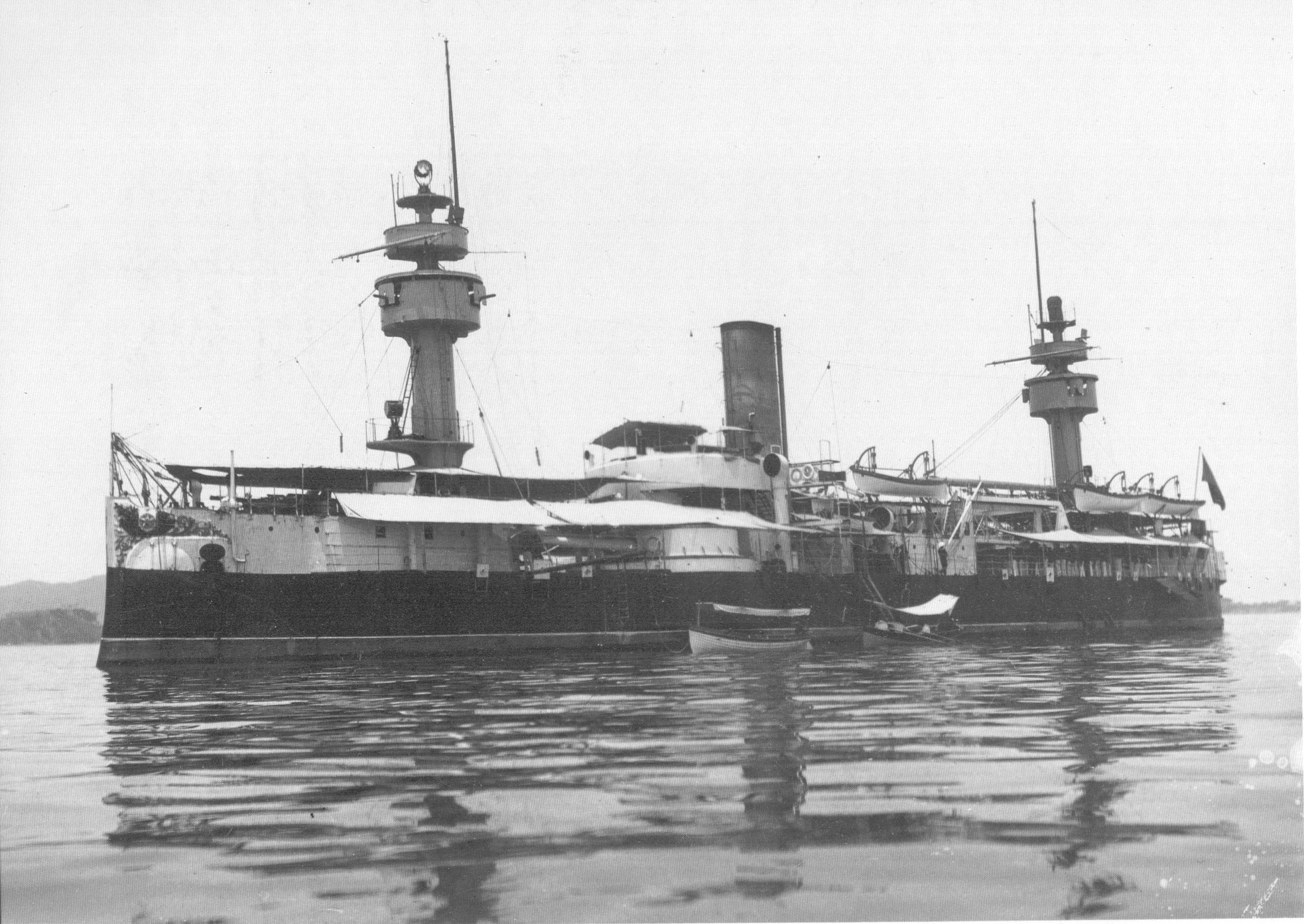
Aquidabã seen between 1898 and 1904, as evidenced by the two heavy masts

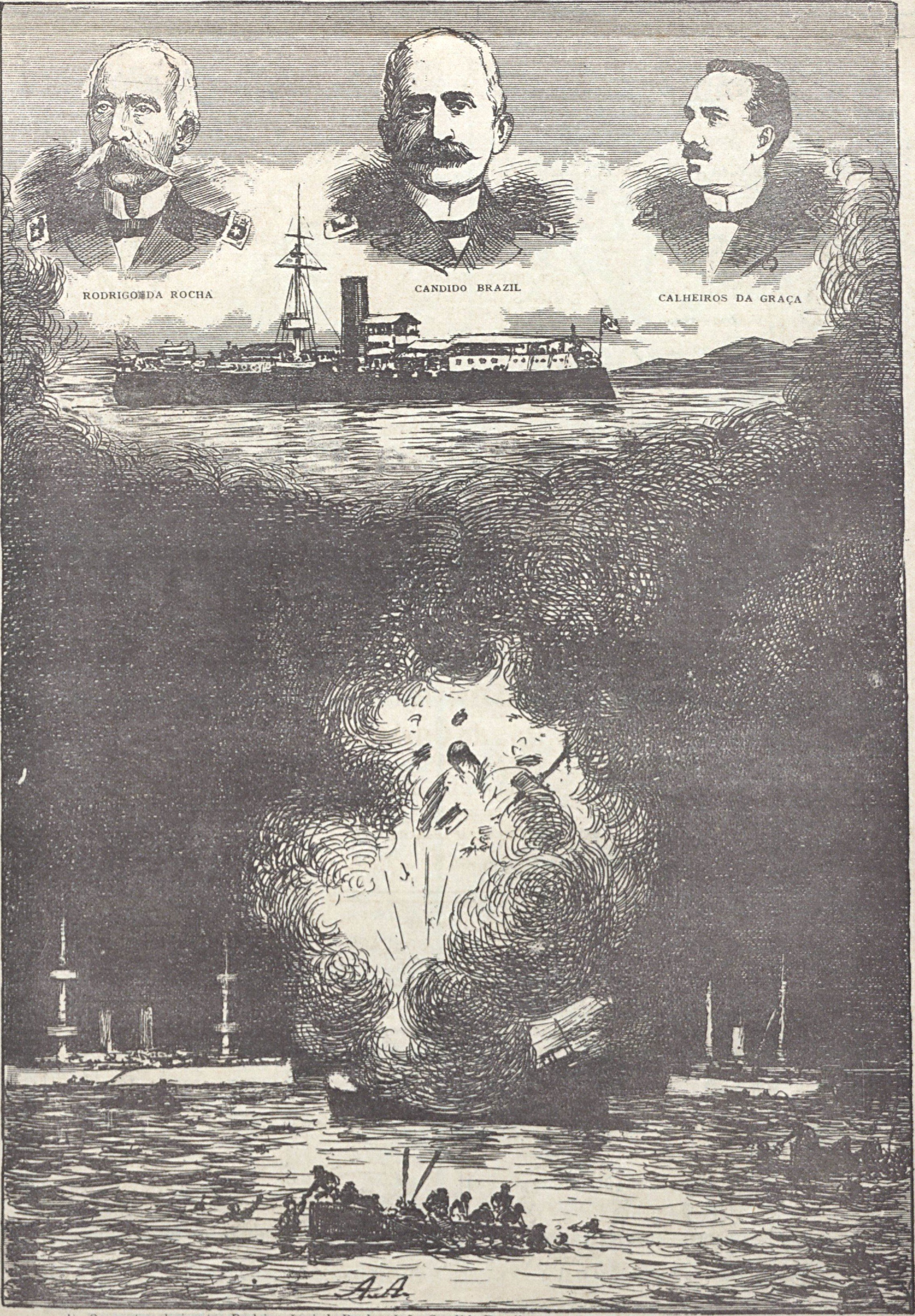
On 21 January 1906, the powder magazines of the Aquidabã blew up, sinking the ship within three minutes (Angelo Agostini, O Malho, 1906)

In 1900 she was renamed again, this time to restore her original name. In 1904, the ship underwent further modernization at the island of Ilha das Cobras (English: Snakes Island), near Rio de Janeiro. This included the removal of the two heavy masts that had been installed in 1898 and two torpedo tubes. Aquidabã made many cruises in these years to test the new technology of wireless telegraphy and to train midshipmen.

On 21 January 1906, Aquidabã was scheduled to voyage to the port at Jacarepaguá, near Rio de Janeiro, to escort and accommodate the Minister of Marine and his staff, who were attached to the cruiser Barroso. They were inspecting sites for use as an arsenal. At about 10:45 pm, when she was moored at Jacuacanga Bay, near Ilha Grande (English: Big Island), the powder magazines blew up, sinking the ship within three minutes. A total of 212 people were killed, including three admirals and most of the officers of the ship, and 36 were injured; 98 survived.

== See also ==
- List of historical ships of the Brazilian Navy
