= Battle of Campo Osório =

1895 battle of the Federalist Revolution

- Part of the Federalist Revolution
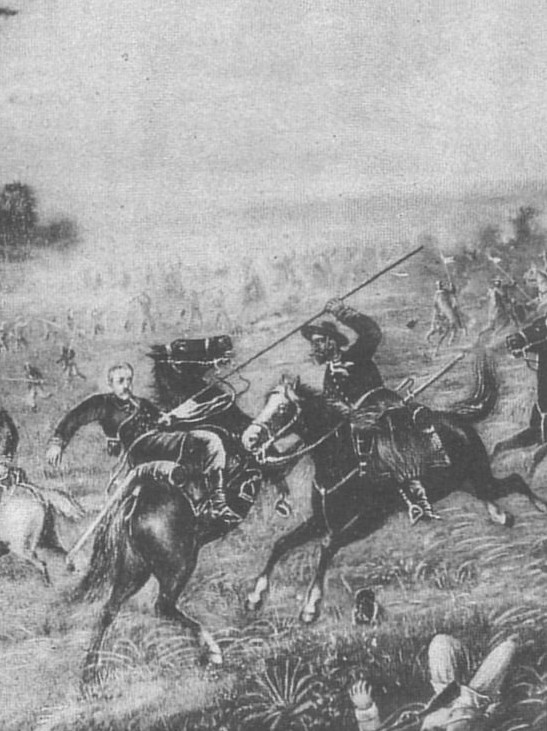
- Death of admiral Saldanha da Gama
Date	24 June 1895
Location	Near Quaraí River, Santana do Livramento, Rio Grande do Sul, Brazil 30°48′46″S 55°59′54″W
Result	Government victory: End of the Federalist Revolution

Belligerents
Federalists; Navy mutineers	Brazil

Commanders and leaders
Saldanha da Gama †	(Brazil) Hipólito Ribeiro

Strength
400–600	1,300

Casualties and losses
150	200

The Battle of Campo Osório, also known as the Combat of Campo Osório, was fought on 24 June 1895 between federalist rebel forces and loyalist troops of the First Brazilian Republic, being the last battle of the Federalist Revolution.

== Battle ==
The rebels, led by admiral Luís Filipe de Saldanha da Gama, former leader of the Second Navy Revolt, were defeated by the troops of general Hyppolito Ribeiro in Campo Osório, an area near the border with Uruguay and north of the Rincão de Artigas, within the municipality of Santana do Livramento, in Rio Grande do Sul. Alongside the Federalists also fought the Navy mutineers following the admiral.

The battle resulted in the death of Saldanha da Gama, one of the main leaders of the federalists and, consequently, in the weakening of the revolution, which was officially ended with a peace treaty signed in Pelotas, between the government and Joca Tavares on behalf of the rebels, in August 23 of the same year.

== Bibliography ==
- Caldas, Honorato (1896). Apotheose do Almirante Saldanha da Gama (in Portuguese). Rio de Janeiro: Typ. e Papelaria de Alex Villela.
- Donato, Hernâni (1987). Dicionário das Batalhas Brasileiras (in Portuguese). São Paulo: Ibrasa.
- de Faria, Durland Puppin (2015). Introdução à história militar brasileira (PDF) (in Portuguese). Resende: Academia Militar das Agulhas Negras.
- Lima, Afonso Guerreiro (1936). Cronologia da história rio-grandense (in Portuguese). Porto Alegre: Livraria do Globo.
- Vianna, Helio; Lacombe, Américo Jacobina (1977). "História do Brasil: período colonial, monarquia e república" (in Portuguese). Editora Melhoramentos.
