= Saldanha da Gama =

Brazilian admiral (1846–1895)

Luís Filipe de Saldanha da Gama
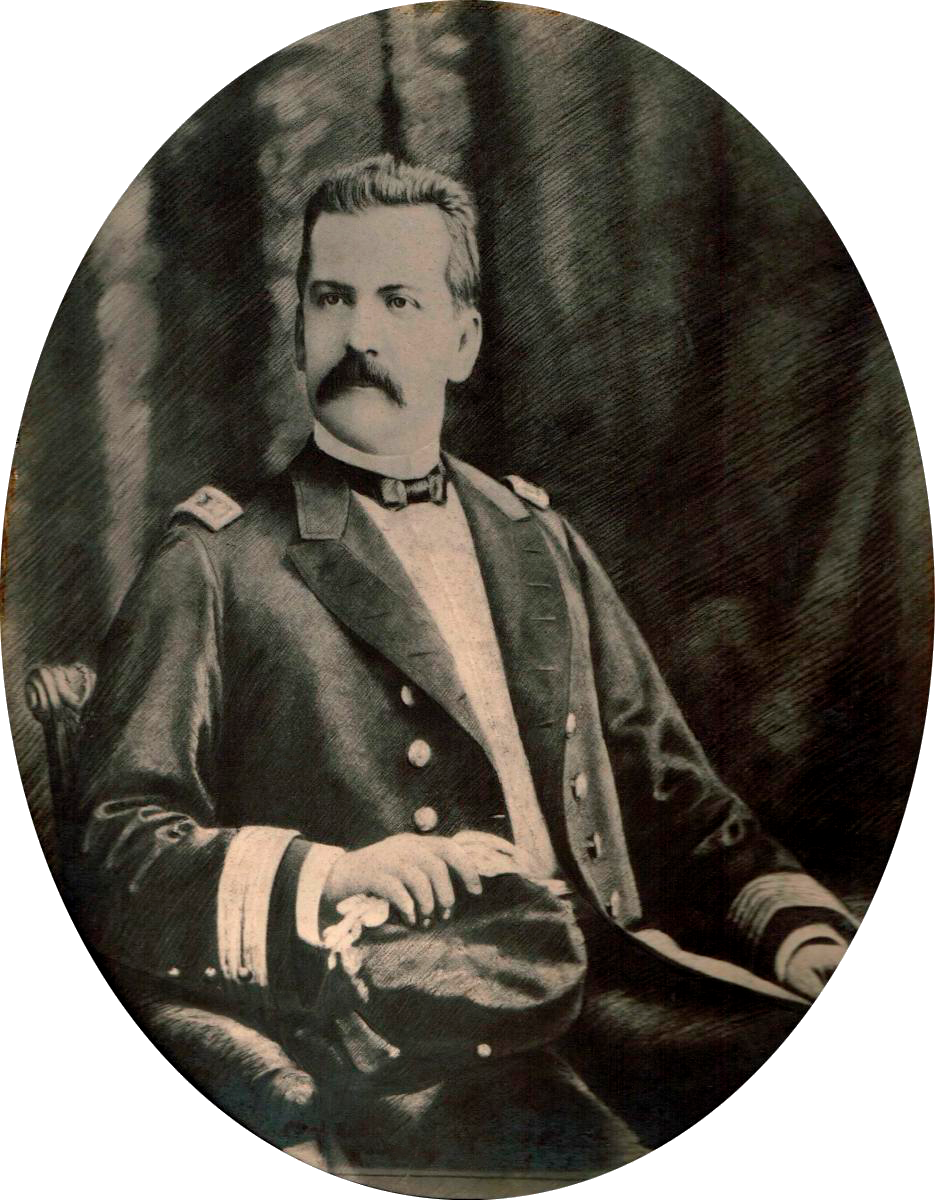
- Born: April 7, 1846; Campos dos Goytacazes, Empire of Brazil
- Died: June 24, 1895 (aged 49); Campo Osório, Rio Grande do Sul, Brazil
- Military career
- Allegiance: Empire of Brazil; Brazil
- Branch: Brazilian Navy; Federalist Army
- Conflicts: Paraguayan War; Siege of Uruguaiana; Brazilian Naval Revolts; Federalist Revolution; Battle of Campo Osório †

Luís Filipe de Saldanha da Gama (7 April 1846 – 24 June 1895) was an admiral of the Brazilian Navy. He led the Revolta da Armada against the First Brazilian Republic alongside Custódio José de Melo and was killed by government forces during the Federalist Revolution in the Battle of Campo Osório.

== Biography ==
A Bachelor of Arts, he took a course at the Academia da Marinha, which he joined at the age of seventeen, always climbing the ranks until reaching admiralty. He represented Brazil at the Vienna exposition in 1873, the Philadelphia exposition in 1876 and the Buenos Aires exhibition in 1882.

He received the dinstinctions for his service in the Paraguayan War, the siege of Uruguaiana and Military Merit. He led the Second Armada Revolt in 1893, participating in the revolt, despite being director of the Naval School in Rio de Janeiro.

Defeated by the troops of Hipólito Ribeiro on 24 June 1895, he was killed in combat at the Battle of Campo Osório by Salvador Sena Tambeiro, a Uruguayan commanded by João Francisco. Witnesses said the admiral's last words were “Respect me! I'm admiral Saldanha!” and the major's reply was: "These are the ones I like!" Tambeiro attacked Saldanha with a spearhead, then cut his throat and mutilated him, tearing out his ears and teeth. Before dying, Saldanha would have said: “Enough, miserable!”. His body would only be found days later and buried in the cemetery of Riveira.

In 1908, his remains, together with those of admiral Francisco Manuel Barroso da Silva, were transferred to Brazil and are currently buried in a mausoleum in the São João Batista Cemetery.

In "Minha Formação" (1900), Joaquim Nabuco says about him:

"I had met Saldanha at the Philadelphia Exposition, then we connected a lot in New York, where we lived in the same hotel, the Buckingham. […] Poor Saldanha! Born for the world, for love, for glory, who would have thought, seeing him back then in New York, that his fate would be what it was? The sphinx of life that had given him, as a teenager, one of his indecipherable enigmas to solve, destroying in him the aspiration to be happy, reappeared again, blocking his step just as he could dispute the most important position in the country".
