= Forte de São Domingos de Gragoatá =

Brazilian fort

- Niterói, Rio de Janeiro in Brazil
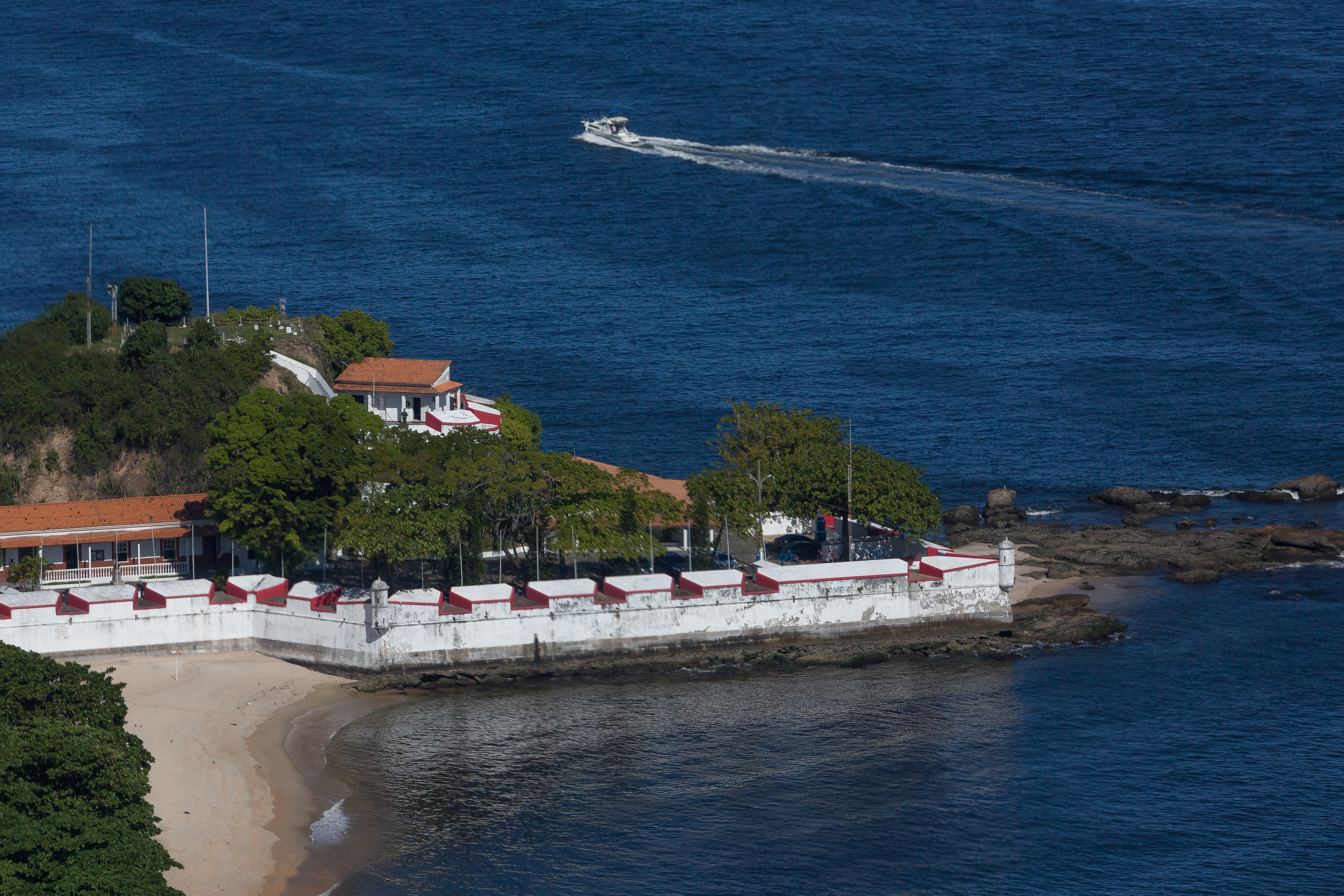
- View of the fort

Site information
- Type: Fort
- Open to the public: Yes
- Condition: Good

Location
- Location of Forte de São Domingos de Gragoatá in Brazil
- Coordinates: 22.903122°S 43.135865°W

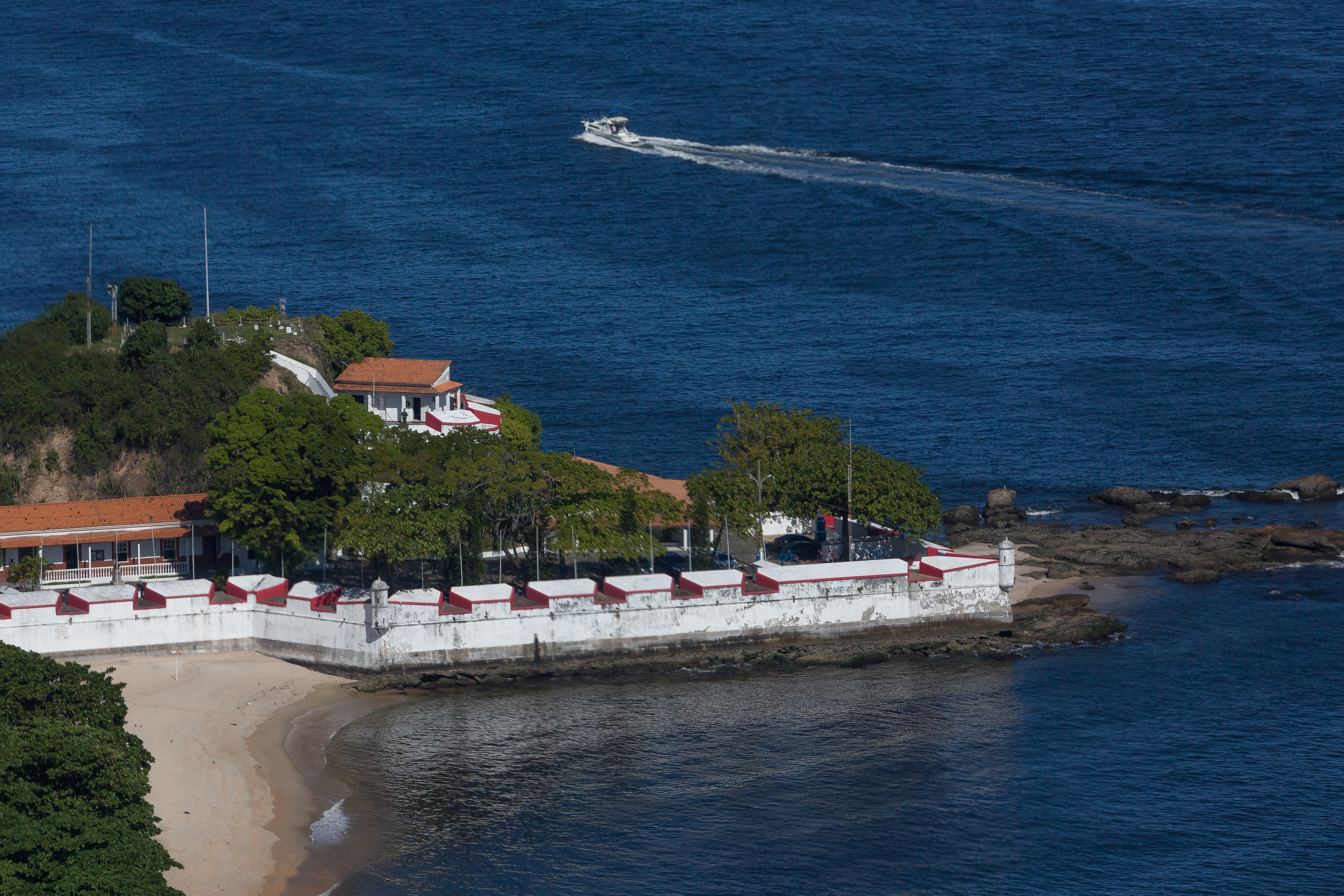
Aerial view dp Fort of São Domingos de Gragoatá.

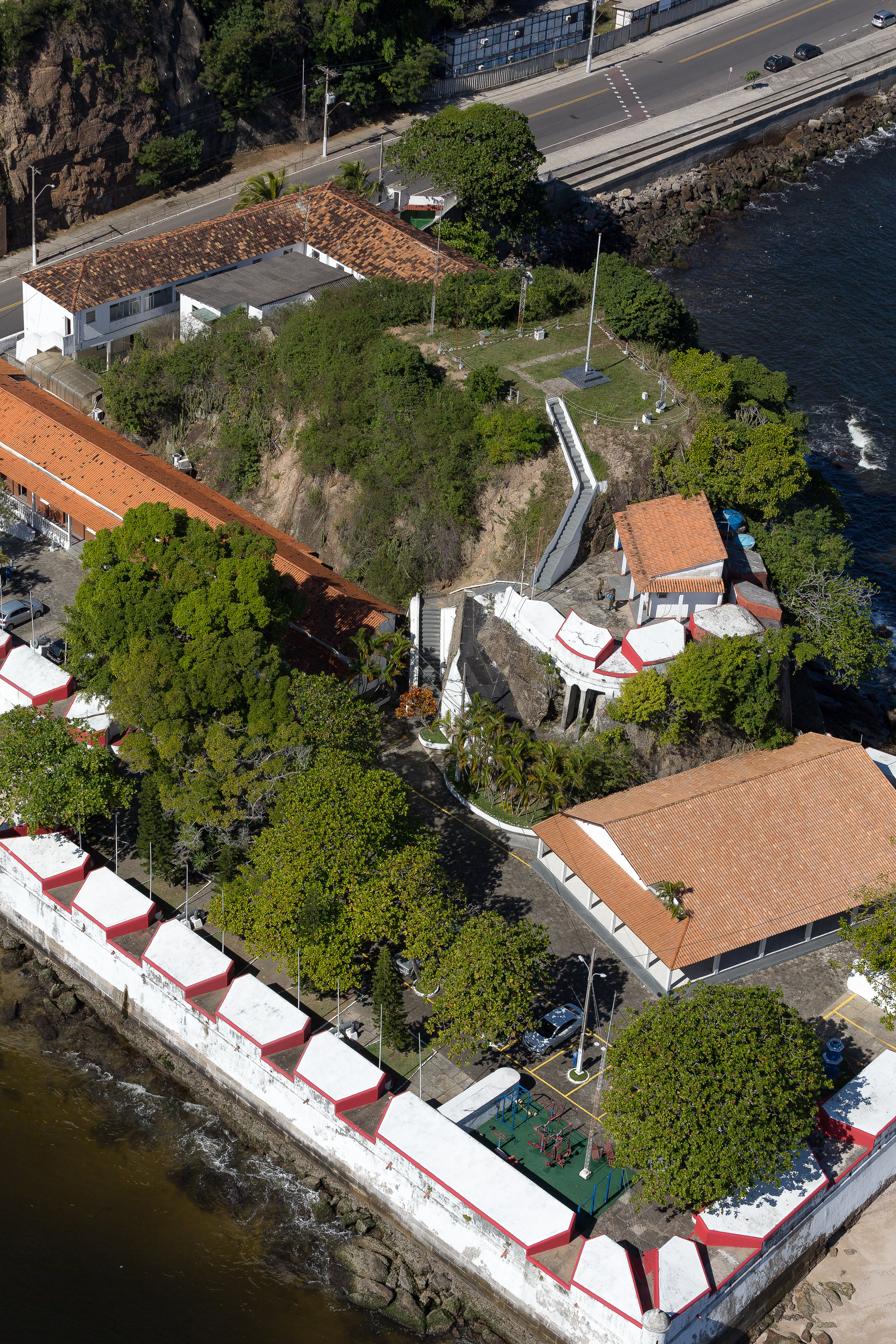
Aerial view dp Fort of São Domingos de Gragoatá.

Forte de São Domingos de Gragoatá is a fort located in Niterói, Rio de Janeiro in Brazil.

== See also ==
- Military history of Brazil
