= Bias Fortes =

Coordinates: 21°36′S 43°46′W

- Municipality
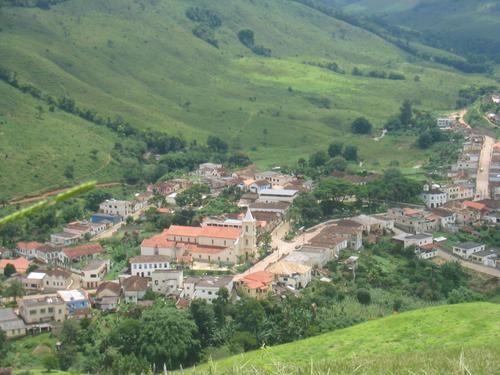

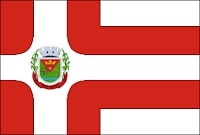
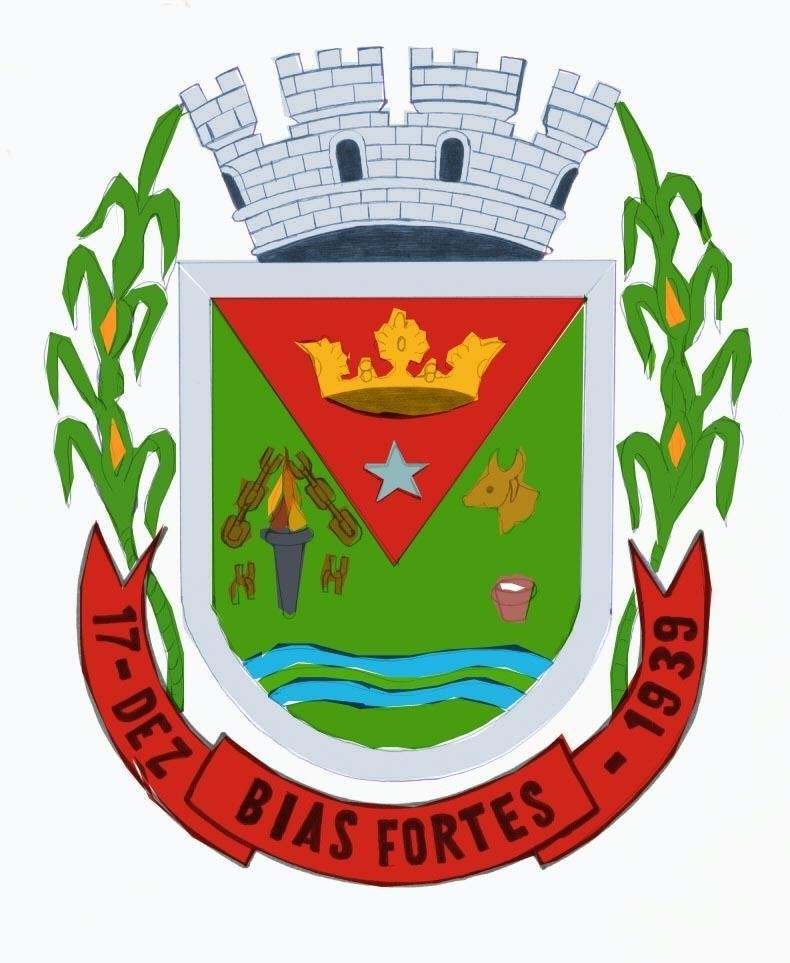
- Flag Coat of arms
- Interactive map of Bias Fortes
- Country: Brazil
- Region: Southeast
- State: Minas Gerais
- Mesoregion: Vale do Rio Doce

Population (2020)
  - Total: 3,329
- Time zone: UTC−3 (BRT)

Bias Fortes is a municipality in the state of Minas Gerais in the Southeast region of Brazil.

== See also ==
- List of municipalities in Minas Gerais
