= Custódio José de Melo =

Brazilian naval officer and politician

Custódio de Melo
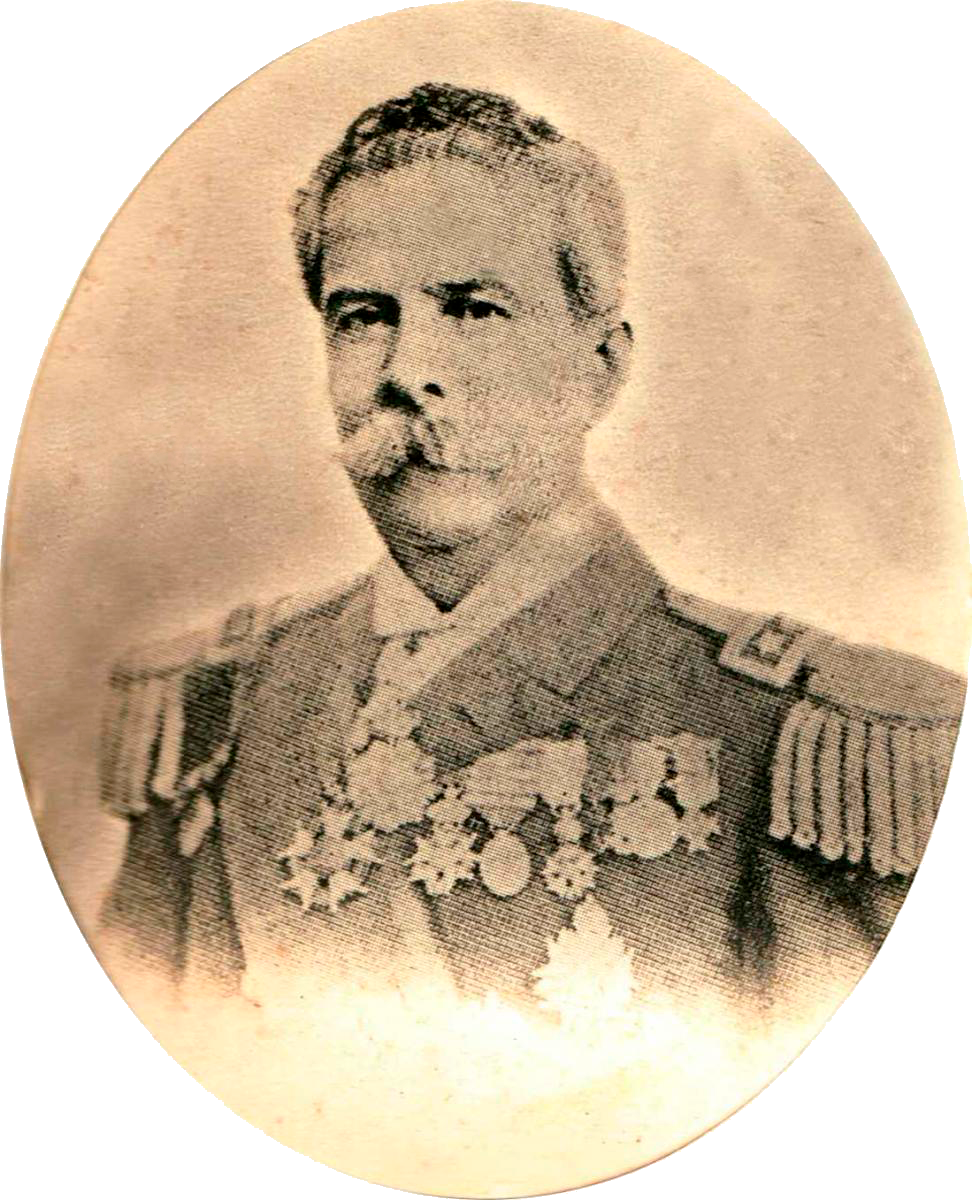
- Rear-admiral Custódio de Melo
- Born: June 9, 1840; Salvador, Bahia, Empire of Brazil
- Died: March 15, 1902 (aged 61); Rio de Janeiro, First Brazilian Republic
- Occupation(s): Naval officer, monarchist politician

Custódio José de Melo (9 June 1840 – 15 March 1902) was a Brazilian admiral and monarchist politician. He led the Brazilian fleet in two naval revolts in 1891 and 1893 in opposition to the authoritarian and dictatorial First Brazilian Republic.
