= Javari-class monitor =

Ship class operated by Imperial Brazilian Navy

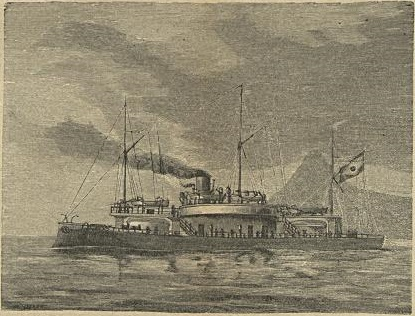
- Javari, the class first ship

Class overview
- Name: Javari class
- Builders: Forges et Chantiers de la Méditerranée
- Operators: Imperial Brazilian Navy
- Built: 1874–1875
- In service: 1875–1893
- Planned: 2
- Completed: 2

General characteristics
- Displacement: 3,700 tons
- Length: 240 ft (73 m)
- Beam: 58.1 ft (17.7 m)
- Draft: 12.3 ft (3.7 m)
- Speed: 11 knots (20 km/h; 13 mph)
- Complement: 135 officers and men
- Armament: 2 × twin Whitworth 254 mm (10.0 in) cannons; 2 x Nordenfelt 37 mm (1.5 in) cannons; 2 x machine guns

Javari class is a naval class made up of the battleship monitors Javari and Solimões built by the Forges et Chantiers de la Méditerranée shipyards in La Seyne and Le Havre in France between 1874 and 1875. The concept of this class originated from the idea of building ships "equipped with all the improvements needed to make them perfect machines for both sea and river warfare".

As soon as they were commissioned, they were incorporated into the Evolutions Squadron. The crew of the Javari issued a declaration of support for the Lei Áurea around this time. Solimões sank on May 19, 1892, under unknown circumstances.

Javari, in turn, sank on November 22, 1893, after an exchange of salvos with the Fortress of São João during the 1893 Navy Revolt. Later reports concluded that the penetration of the shots was caused by the poor condition of the ship at the time of the collision, and the trepidation generated by the firing of the monitor's 254-millimeter cannons.

== General characteristics ==
=== Concept ===
The idea of building the class came about ten years after constructing the Empire's first battleship: Brasil. According to Ribeiro de Luz, "these ironclads would be equipped with all the improvements needed to make them perfect machines for both sea and river warfare." However, this finding turned out to be mistaken, as the future battleships proved to be slow and unreliable on the open sea due to their excessively low freeboard.

=== Dimensions, armaments, and armor ===
The monitors (Note: Another source says that the ships were of the coastal defense battleship type.) displaced 3,700 tons. Its dimensions consisted of 73 meters in length, 17.70 meters in beam, and 3.75 meters in draft. Its armor consisted of 304-millimeter plates amidships and in the gunboats, 177 millimeters in the bow and stern, 76 millimeters on deck, and 101 millimeters in the conning tower.

Its propulsion was made up of steam engines, generating 2,500 horsepower, coupled to two shafts. This allowed the Javari-class monitors to reach a maximum speed of eleven knots. Its armament included four 254-millimeter Whitworth cannons in two double turrets, two 37-millimeter Nordenfelt cannons, and two machine guns. Its garrison numbered 135 men.

== Service history ==
Both the Javari and the Solimões were built at the Forges et chantiers de la Méditerranée shipyard in La Seyne and Le Havre, France, between 1874 and 1875. The monitors were built under the supervision of Lieutenant Captain EN Carlos Braconnot. These ships were named after the rivers of the same name located in the province of Grão-Pará. They underwent armament and incorporation shows between 1875 and 1876. The first commander of the Solimões was Commander Miguel de Melo Tamborim, while the Javari had José Marques Guimarães as its initial commander. The Javari-class ships were the largest in the navy when they were incorporated.

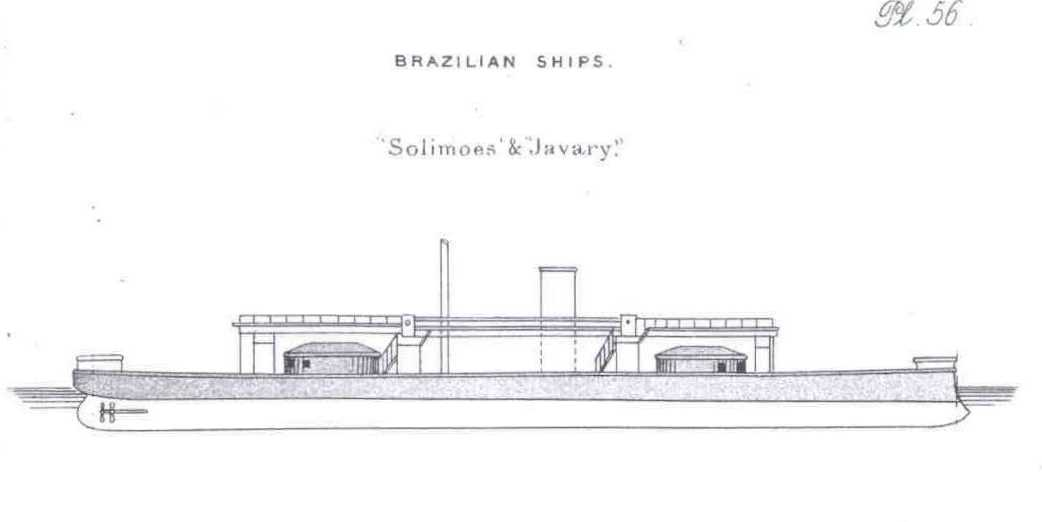
Drawing of the Javari class

When they arrived in Brazil, it was expected that the ships would be endowed with great power and maneuverability. With relatively low freeboards, they faced difficulties operating in rough seas and had limited maneuverability and lower speeds compared to contemporary ships of the same type (11 miles/h — 17.7 km/h). Maneuverability was improved in an upgrade carried out between 1880 and 1881 when new rudders were installed, but the ships primarily operated in coastal or sheltered waters.

In March 1880, the Solimões experienced a mechanical failure while sailing to Ilha Grande and drifted off course. Several vessels began searching for the monitor, which was found on the 17th, about seven miles south of Ponta de Caruçu. It was towed to Rio de Janeiro and anchored on March 25. On August 19, 1884, by Notice No. 1541-A, the Evolutions Squadron was created, focusing on the navy's advancements in propulsion, artillery, and torpedoes under the command of squadron chief Artur Silveira de Motta. The monitors became part of the squadron's sixteen ships (the battleships Riachuelo and Sete de Setembro) the hybrid cruisers Guanabara (1874) and Almirante Barroso (1882); the ocean-going corvettes Trajano, Barroso, and Primeiro de Março; the 1st Class torpedo boats (50 tons) 1, 2, 3, 4 and 5 and the 4th Class torpedo boats (50 tons) Alfa (1883), Beta (1883) and Gama (1883). Solimões underwent renovations in 1889, receiving an additional helm and improvements to her armaments.

Days before the signing of the Lei Áurea that abolished slavery in Brazil, there was a popular mobilization, with the participation of journalists, to raise funds for the purchase of the golden feather that would be used on the occasion. Members of the crew of the Javari sent a short text in support of the mobilization. On March 27, 1892, the Solimões was accompanied by the monitor Bahia and both headed for the port of Santos to carry out joint maneuvers. On the way, the commander of the Solimões received a mission, via telegraph, to head for Corumbá, in what was then the province of Mato Grosso, to support the legalists who were fighting a separatist insurrection. In addition to the Solimões, the monitors Bahia and Rio Grande and the Carioca (gunboat) were also sent on this mission. Due to adverse weather conditions, the fleet anchored in the port of Santa Catarina on May 13. (Note: This gap of months is not explained by the source.) Two days later, the weather improved and the fleet resumed its course towards Mato Grosso. However, on the 18th, bad weather again affected the ships off the coast of Rio Grande do Sul, where the battleship was last sighted. The Solimões sank at around 10 p.m. on May 19, with five crew members making it to safety.

Reports from the surviving crew say that the Solimões was having navigational problems due to the rough seas. The ship had a perforation in its hull, through which water began to enter, which led to the explosion of the boilers and the sinking of the ship. Some reports indicate that Captain Xavier de Castro ordered a group of crew members to take a dinghy to the coast to request help from the nearest authorities. Those chosen were nurse José Correa Maguena, three sailors, and a stoker, namely Agostinho de Mattos, Correa do Nascimento, Antônio Solimões, and José Luiz. They reported that they were to reach the coast when they heard an explosion coming from the direction of the monitor. When they looked, they could no longer see the ship.

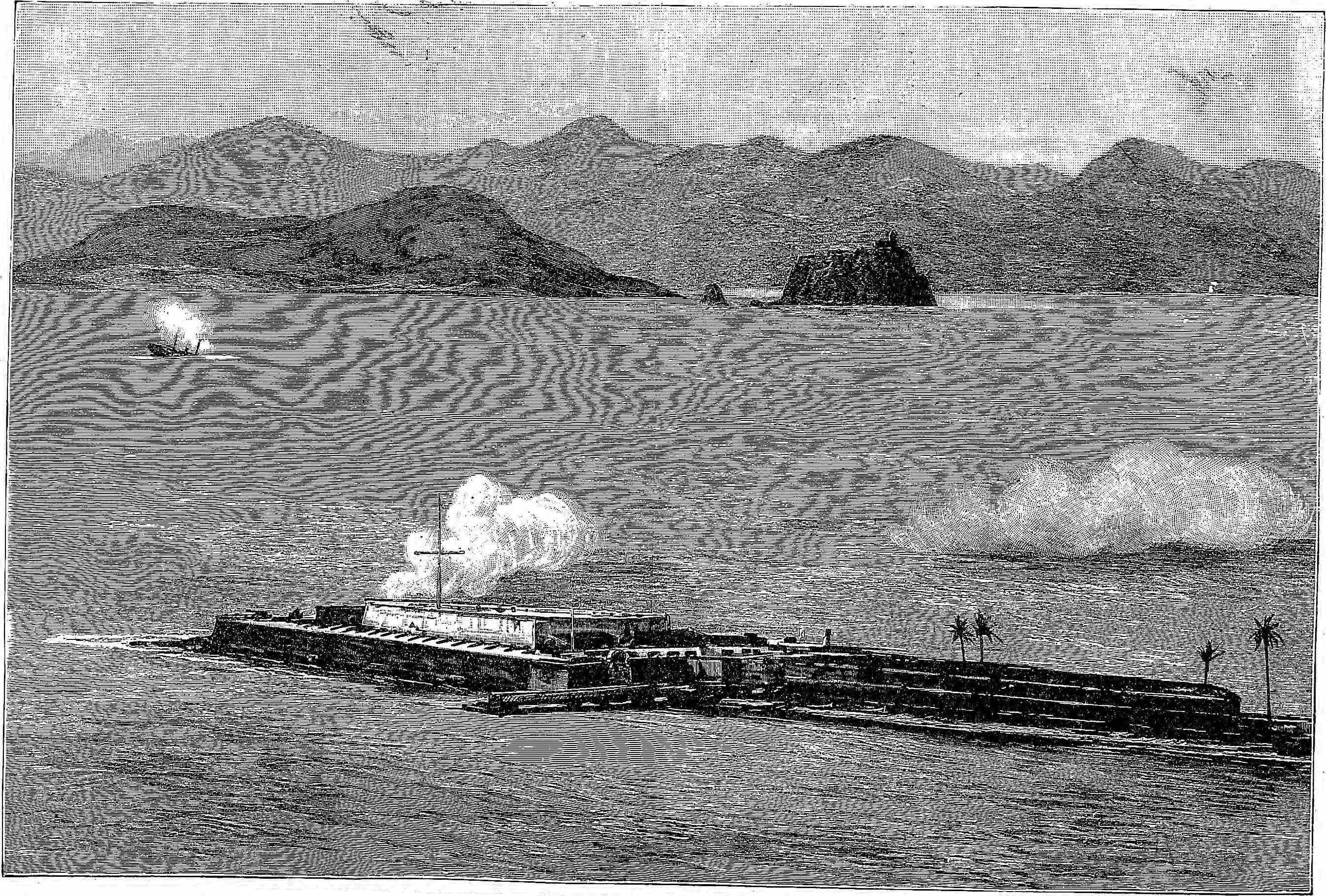
View of the Fortress of Villegaignon in possession of the insurgent forces: the sinking vessel is the monitor Javary (The Graphic, 06/01/1894).

The Javari remained in commission for another year after the incident, participating in the Revolt of the Navy. The ship was responsible for defending the insurgents' main weapons depot (Ponta da Armação). It was without its propulsion and was anchored between Ponta do Calabouço and Villegagnon Island, in Guanabara Bay, when it started a confrontation with the fortresses of Barra do Rio de Janeiro.

The shots, likely from the Fortress of São João, struck the stern, causing a breach through which water began to enter. The tug Vulcano attempted to move Javari to a safer position for repairs, but this was not feasible due to ongoing damage to the monitor. It sank gradually, with its main cannons firing until they were no longer operational. Its sinking allowed Ponta da Armação to be taken. Later reports concluded that the penetration of the shots, which would not have been expected given the ship's armor, was due to the ship's condition at the time of the collision and the vibrations caused by the shots from the monitor's 254-millimeter cannons.

== Ships ==
Name	Image	Homonym	Builder	Concluded	Fall	Ref.
Javari	Monitor Javari, sunk off Fort Villegaignon on November 22 by a shell from a Government fort.	Javari River	Forges et Chantiers de la Méditerranée	1874	1893	
Solimões	Monitor Solimões.	Solimões River	Forges et Chantiers de la Méditerranée	1875	1892	

== See also ==
- List of historical ships of the Brazilian Navy
