= Brazilian cruiser Almirante Barroso (1882) =

Cruiser of the Brazilian Navy

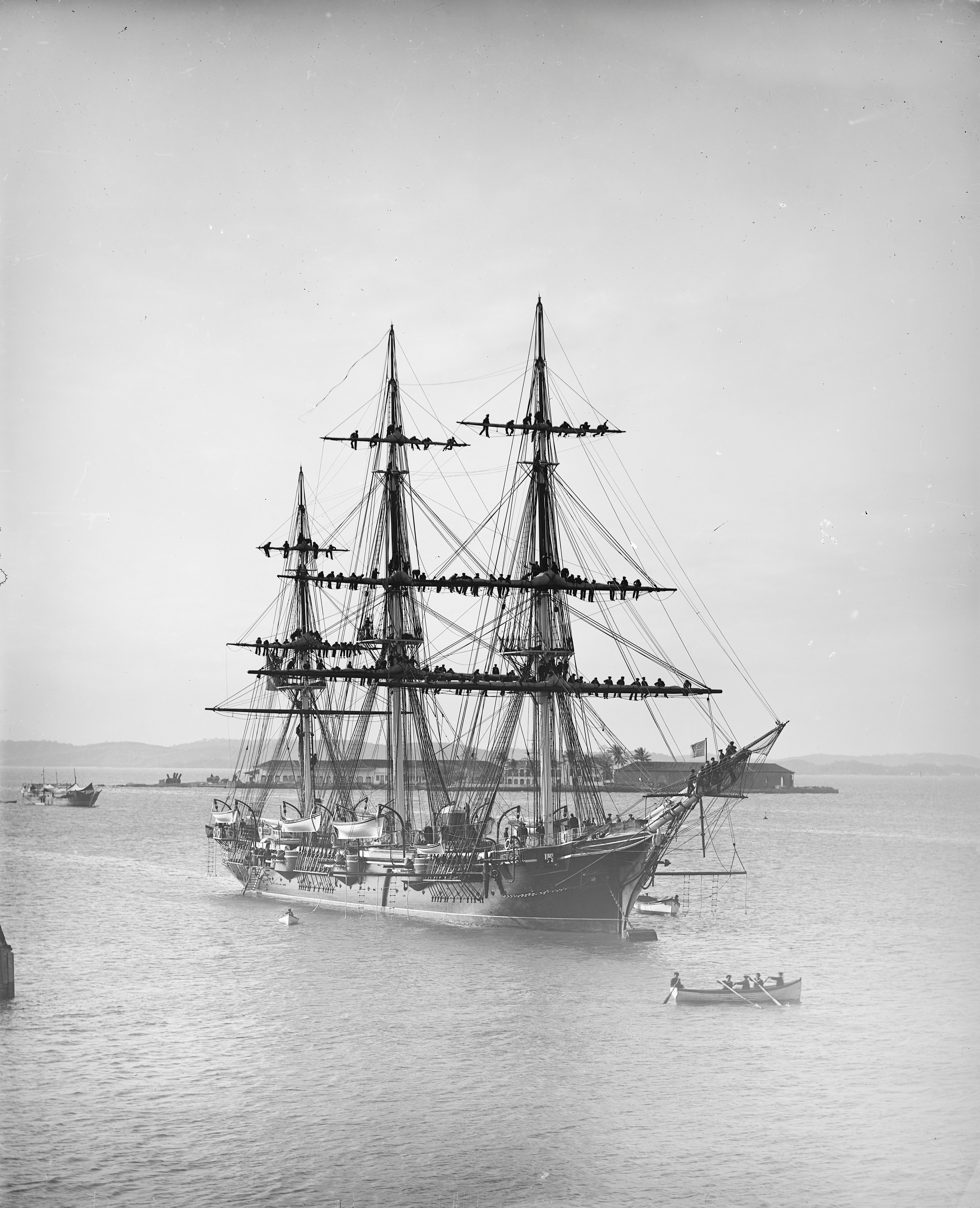
- Almirante Barroso, picture by Marc Ferrez dated 27 October 1888

History

Empire of Brazil
- Name: Almirante Barroso
- Namesake: Francisco Manuel Barroso
- Ordered: Empire of Brazil
- Builder: Rio de Janeiro Navy Arsenal
- Cost: 1.4 billion réis
- Laid down: 1 March 1880
- Launched: 17 April 1882
- Commissioned: 19 July 1882
- Decommissioned: 21 May 1893
- Fate: Sunk

General characteristics
- Class & type: Cruiser
- Displacement: 2,050 tons
- Length: 71.25 m (233 ft 9 in)
- Beam: 10.97 m (36 ft 0 in)
- Draft: 5.10 m (16.7 ft)
- Installed power: 2,200 hp
- Propulsion: Mixed steam-sail
- Sail plan: Corvette-rigged
- Speed: 13 knots (24 km/h; 15 mph)
- Complement: 285
- Armament: 6 × 1 – 70 cal. Whitworth guns; 4 × 1 – 25mm Nordenfelt; 6 × 1 – 11mm Nordenfelt

Almirante Barroso was a cruiser operated by the Imperial Brazilian Navy and later the Brazilian Navy from 1882 to 1893. Its name is a tribute to Brazilian admiral Francisco Manuel Barroso da Silva, the Baron of Amazonas. Its construction began in 1880 at the Rio de Janeiro Navy Arsenal, being launched into the sea in 1882. The ship was a demonstration of the potential of the Brazilian naval industry at the time, built with a combination of wood and steel.

Almirante Barroso had a displacement of 2,050 tons and a speed of 13 knots. Its armament included Whitworth cannons, Nordenfelt machine guns, and a Kropatshek portable weapon system. The construction of the ship was a substantial investment, totaling 1.4 billion réis.

After its incorporation into the Evolutions Squadron in 1884, Almirante Barroso participated in instructional commissions and trips around the world, reinforcing the modernization of the Imperial Brazilian Navy. However, the vessel faced a relatively tense moment during the fall of the Brazilian monarchy in 1889, when August Leopold, the Imperial Prince of Brazil, on board the ship during a circumnavigation trip, found himself involved in the political transition.

The ship then continued its circumnavigation journey which culminated in its return to Rio de Janeiro in 1890, after a 301-day voyage around the world. Almirante Barroso was shipwrecked in 1893 on a coral reef in the Red Sea. Despite rescue efforts, the ship could not be saved, resulting in its loss. Years later, divers claimed to have found its remains, but were unable to prove the origins of the shipwreck.

== Characteristics ==
The ship's technical specifications were: displacement of 2,050 tons, total length of 71.25 m (233.8 ft), a length between perpendiculars of 64.05 m (210.1 ft), a width of 11.33 m (37.2 ft), a depth of 10.97 m (36.0 ft) and an average draft of 6.4 m (21 ft). The ship's engine, designed under the plans and supervision of lieutenant captain and naval engineer Manuel Alves Barbosa, had an effective power of 2,200 hp that allowed the vessel to reach a speed of 12 or 13 knots. In addition to the machines, the cruiser also had sails as a means of propulsion, being rigged as a corvette with a surface area of 1,625 m^{2} (17,490 sq ft).

The ship was equipped with two Admiralty-type boilers. In addition, it had a propeller and a chimney. The construction cost of this warship was substantial, totaling 1.4 billion réis. The ship's artillery included six 70-pounder Whitworth naval guns mounted on rifled Levasseur carriages, arranged en barbette. In addition, the ship was equipped with a bow gun, four 25 mm Nordenfelt machine guns and six 11 mm machine guns of the same type. Later, the ship's portable armament was upgraded with the Kropatshek system. Its crew consisted of 285 officers and enlisted men. In general, Almirante Barroso was already outdated in the decade prior to its construction, despite representing an evolution of the Brazilian naval industry in the construction of this type of vessel since the period before the Paraguayan War (1864–1870).

== Construction ==
Almirante Barroso was the second ship in the Brazilian Navy to bear this name. It is a tribute to admiral Francisco Manuel Barroso da Silva, the first and only Baron of Amazonas. The other vessels that paid homage to the Brazilian hero were the ironclad Barroso (1865), the cruiser Almirante Barroso (C-1) (1895), the light cruiser Barroso (C-11) (1951) and the corvette Barroso (2008). The iron used in its construction was produced by the São José do Ipanema Factory.

The ship's keel was laid at the Rio de Janeiro Navy Arsenal on 1 March 1880. The launch event, which took place on 17 April 1882, was a celebration attended by emperor Pedro II, the Baron of Amazonas himself, state ministers, local authorities and a crowd of people. Christened with pomp, the ship carried out its armament display on 19 July 1882 and received its badge number 22. The ship, of mixed construction, incorporating wood and steel, was a demonstration of the potential and ingenuity of the Brazilian naval industry and force at the time.

== History ==
=== Commissions ===
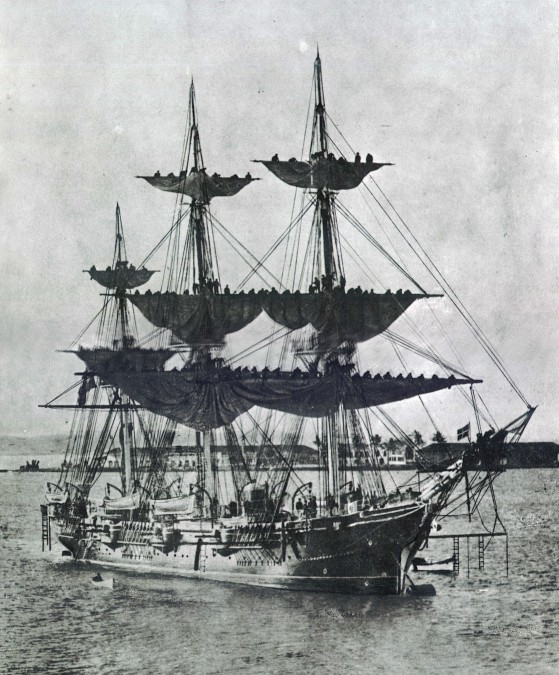
Almirante Barroso, unknown date

Almirante Barroso was incorporated into the newly created Evolutions Squadron on 19 August 1884. This event was the result of Notice No. 1,541A, issued by the then minister of navy affairs, admiral Joaquim Raimundo de Lamare. The Evolutions Squadron was headed by chief of squadron Artur Silveira da Mota, who held the title of Baron of Jaceguai. Consisting of sixteen ships, the squadron stood out for the battleships Riachuelo, Sete de Setembro, Solimões and Javary, as well as the cruisers Guanabara, Trajano and Primeiro de Março. The presence of Torpedeira Nº 1-class boats 1, 2, 3, 4 and 5, together with 4th class Alpha, Beta and Gamma torpedo boats, reinforced the fleet's firepower and maneuverability.

The Evolutions Squadron represented the most modern and advanced nucleus of the Imperial Brazilian Navy at that time. It was equipped with ships with the best technologies in terms of propulsion, artillery and torpedo systems, demonstrating Brazil's commitment to maintaining an effective naval force capable of adapting to changes in the geopolitical landscape. The creation of the Evolutions Squadron also marked the beginning of a period of transformation and modernization of the Brazilian Navy.

Command of Almirante Barroso was initially given to captain José Marques Guimarães, who was replaced by captain Luís Filipe de Saldanha da Gama in 1884. During its speed experiments, the ship faced an obstacle when it ran aground on the Obuzes rocks due to the displacement of a signaling buoy. However, it soon proved its navigation capabilities after receiving the order to "follow its destination", detaching itself from a division and sailing to several coastal locations, such as Abrolhos, Ilha Grande, Florianópolis and the region of Abraão, Santana and Angra dos Reis.

The ship also undertook instructional voyages, with midshipmen on board. One of these commissions included stops in places such as Recife, Barbados, Jamaica, New Orleans and New York, demonstrating its ability to cross the Atlantic. During its travels, the ship made stops at several islands and ports, including the Azores, Madeira, Cape Verde, São Vicente and São Tiago. The year 1888 saw the ship being incorporated into a division that traveled through northern Brazil, making stops at places such as Pernambuco, Fernando de Noronha, São Luís and Belém do Pará. The ship's instruction committee continued to be an important focus of its operations, and it soon prepared for a circumnavigation voyage under the command of captain of sea and war Custódio José de Melo. However, after a visit from emperor Pedro II and the imperial family on 27 October 1888, Almirante Barroso departed towards its expected circumnavigation voyage.

=== Circumnavigation voyage ===
During its next journey, the Almirante Barroso received additional crew at different ports, which was expected given the routine nature of these additions. In Montevideo, first lieutenant José Augusto de Armelino and Dr. Henrique dos Santos Reis embarked on 5 November, followed by machinist Nicolau José Marques in Valparaiso, on 23 November. The itinerary that followed covered several continents and cities around the world, but without extraordinary events. The trip began with a visit to Montevideo, where the ship remained from 5 to 12 November. It then sailed to Buenos Aires, where it stayed from 13 to 23 November. After returning to Montevideo, the ship departed again on 24 November and arrived in Punta Arenas, where it remained from 19 to 28 December. The next destination was Valparaiso, where it was anchored from 23 January to 24 February 1889. The voyage continued eastward, with the ship stopping in Sydney, Australia, from 8 May to 6 June. Then, the route continued to Japan, with stops in Yokohama, from 20 July to 4 August, and Nagasaki, from 9 to 15 August. The ship made a stop in Shanghai, China, from 18 to 27 August, and in Hong Kong, from 1 to 29 September. The voyage continued with visits to Singapore, where the vessel docked from 8 to 16 October, and Batavia, from 20 to 30 October.

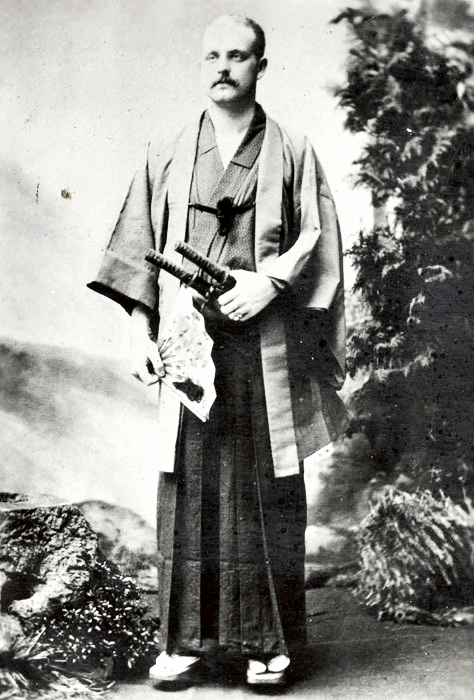
Imperial prince August Leopold in traditional Japanese clothing during Almirante Barroso's stopover in Japan, 1889

Imperial prince August Leopold was on board the vessel during the events of the fall of the Brazilian monarchy caused by the coup of 15 November 1889. The shock caused by this turnaround in Brazilian politics was amplified by the difficulty of communication at the time. Almirante Barroso's crew only became aware of the events unfolding in Brazil in December. Telegrams coming from admiral Eduardo Wandenkolk, who held the position of Minister of the Navy in the provisional republican government, directed the cruiser's commander to take drastic measures. It was necessary to replace the imperial insignia on the flags, a symbolic act that represented the end of the monarchical regime, and to induce prince Leopold to resign. Faced with such a situation, the prince did not make a hasty decision. He consulted with his grandfather and his uncle, the Count of Eu, carefully considering the steps to take. However, prince Leopold decided not to resign, but to request a two-month leave of absence.

Wandenkolk's response to the leave request was clear and incisive, marking the point of no return in prince Leopold's life: "Prince, resign [from] service, I grant leave. Wandenkolk". August Leopold then disembarked in Colombo, Ceylon, where Almirante Barroso's crew offered him a farewell dinner. The event was full of emotion and symbolism, representing not only a separation between the prince and his traveling companions, but also the end of an era for the Brazilian monarchy. In an act of generosity, Leopold distributed his belongings among his companions.

The voyage continued with stops at Oleh Leh, from 30 November to 7 December, Colombo, from 13 to 23 December, and Bombay, where the ship remained from 30 December 1889 to 22 February 1890. During this journey, there was a change in the leadership of the vessel. The ship's commander, captain of sea and war Custódio de Melo, was promoted to rear admiral, which required him to transfer command to captain of sea and war Joaquim Marques Batista de Leão. The journey continued with stops in Jeddah, from 5 to 8 March, Suez, from 22 to 23 March, Port Said, from 24 to 25 March, Alexandria, from 26 March to 7 April, Naples, from 15 to 24 April, Toulon, from 28 April to 18 May, Barcelona, from 19 May to 2 June, Gibraltar, from 5 to 9 June, and Bahia, from 9 to 28 July. The trip culminated with arrival in Rio de Janeiro on 29 June 1890 at 10:30. After 301 days and 7 hours of navigation, the ship covered a total of 17,965 nautical miles (33,271 km; 20,674 mi) under steam and 17,507 nmi (32,423 km; 20,147 mi) under sail. In the mid-1890s, the vessel was preparing for another circumnavigation voyage, demonstrating its continued importance in the Brazilian Navy.

=== Shipwreck ===
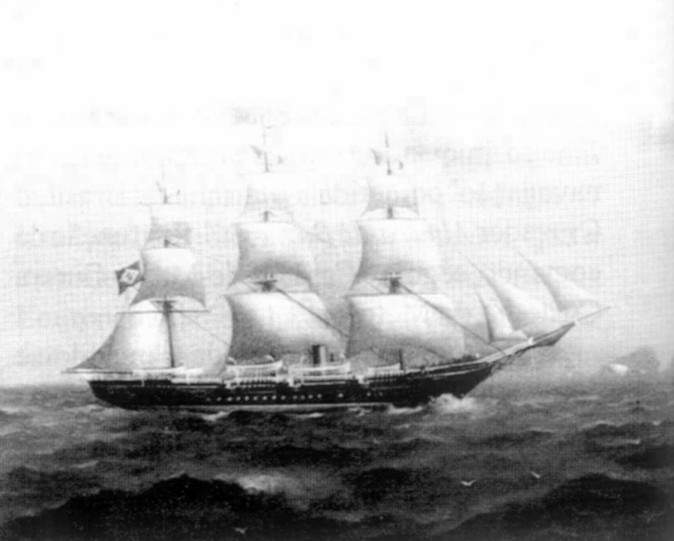
Almirante Barroso on the high seas

After leaving Toulon, the ship faced a setback on 20 January 1893, when a violent storm hit the Gulf of Lion, causing serious damage to the vessel. Given the extent of the damage, the ship needed to return to the Port of Toulon to undergo substantial repairs. After the necessary repairs, the ship embarked its previous crew, with the exception of a first lieutenant, and continued its journey. Entering the Red Sea, it sailed forward until it was approximately 120 nmi (220 km; 140 mi) south of Suez. About 30 nmi (56 km; 35 mi) south of the Ras Gharib lighthouse, in front of Zeiti Beach, in the Jubal Strait, in the early hours of 21 May 1893, at around 01:30, the ship ran aground on a coral bank, and could not be saved.

According to first lieutenant Felinto Perry, who was on board, Almirante Barroso was sailing at full speed, and he was on the parade ground, organizing meteorological observations in a book. Shortly after he went to bed, the ship suffered a collision, causing tremors. Perry realized something serious was happening when he felt stronger shocks and heard maneuvering voices and hurried footsteps on board. He quickly dressed and went to the awning, where he found the commander and other officers already involved in trying to save the ship. Almirante Barroso ran aground and was being pushed against rocks by the waves. An attempt to launch a longboat with an inadequate crew was difficult and unsuccessful. Perry decided to try to take an anchor to help with the situation. He jumped into a longboat with the aim of convincing the others that it was impossible to bring in the anchor due to the dangerous sea conditions. As they tried to approach the vessel with the anchor, a large wave threatened to capsize the boat. The author cut the cable that held the anchor, relieving the weight of the vessel and preventing imminent sinking. The situation became tragic, as, during efforts to rescue a crew member, assistant engineer Tancredo J. Alves lost his life, trying to save one of his colleagues.

The crew was trapped for three days on Zeiti beach, amid difficult circumstances. The rescue was carried out by the British gunboat HMS Dolphin, commanded by officer Christopher Cradock, who rescued the garrison of the sunken ship. The action of the British commander and his crew was fundamental in saving the lives and ensuring the safety of the Brazilian sailors. After the rescue procedures were carried out, Almirante Barroso remained on the surface for a while, although attached to the corals. Bedouin looters took advantage of the vessel being at risk and completely looted the ship. This situation raised controversy regarding a pilot who guided the vessel's path from the Gulf of Lion. The accusation was raised that this pilot was in collusion with a Bedouin tribal leader. However, nothing was proven against him and he was eventually acquitted of any accusation.

An investigation was initiated by the Navy's War Council to determine whether commander Joaquim Marques Batista de Leão was responsible, but he was also acquitted. Some 125 years later, in February 2018, a group of divers from the Sea Red Explorers claimed to have allegedly found the remains of Almirante Barroso on an underwater expedition in the Gubal Strait, approximately three nautical miles (6 km; 3 mi) north of a coastal island. Submerged between 62 and 73 meters deep, the supposed sunken cruiser rested, resting on the sand of the ocean floor. Despite the team of researchers admitting that there was still no complete proof of the origins of the wreck, the measurements, characteristics and location coincide with recorded historical data.

== See also ==
- List of historical ships of the Brazilian Navy
