= Evolutions Squadron =

Evolution Squadron
- Esquadra de Evoluções
- Active: 19 August 1884 – 1886
- Country: Empire of Brazil
- Branch: Imperial Brazilian Navy
- Type: naval squadron
- Garrison/HQ: Neutral Municipality

Commanders
- Notable commanders: Artur Silveira da Mota

The Evolution Squadron was a naval squadron of the Brazilian Imperial Fleet composed of the best ships of its time in several characteristics. It was created in 1884 with the purpose of developing new naval tactics inspired by the Austria tactics in the Battle of Lissa where its naval force faced and defeated the much superior Italian fleet.

== History ==
=== Origins ===
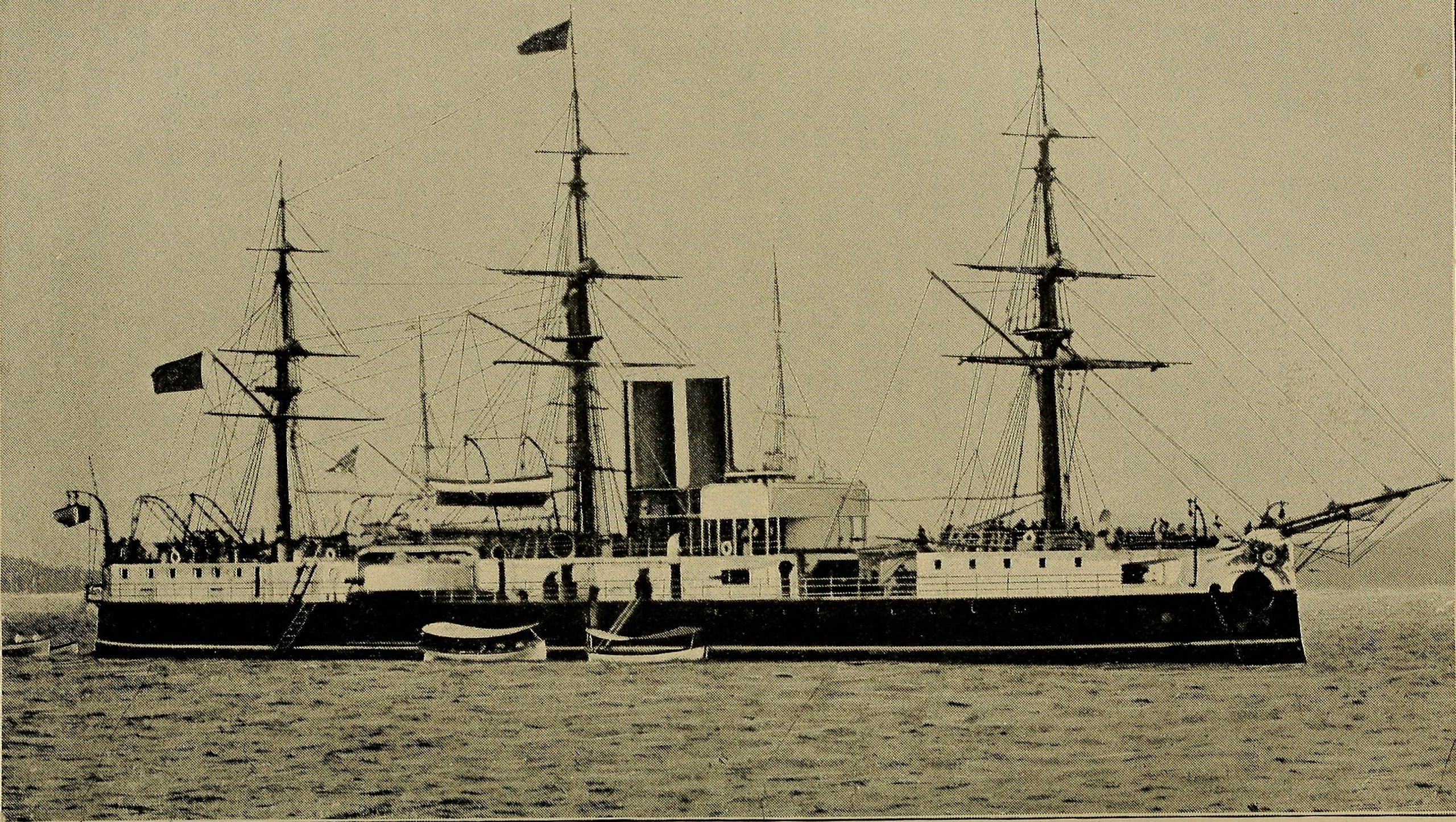
The battleship Riachuelo, 1885.

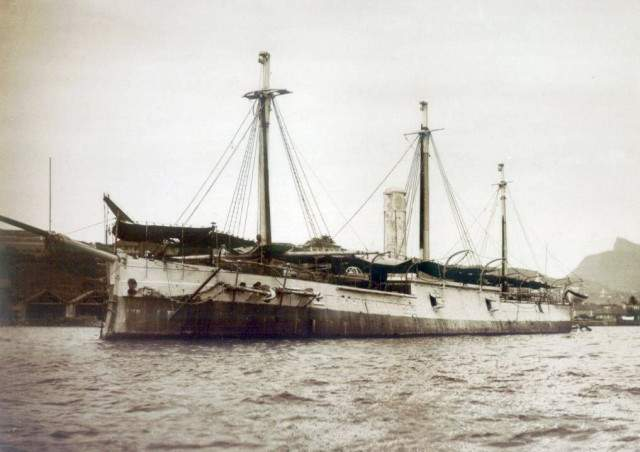
The ironclad warship Sete de Setembro.

After the end of the Paraguayan War, Brazil was concerned with repairing the damage caused to its vessels, refitting them and transforming the Armada into the fourth most powerful navy in the world. From 1870, with the possibility of a conflict with Argentina, the Brazilian Empire aimed to further strengthen its Armada. In 1873 it acquired a gunboat and a corvette; a battleship and a monitor in 1874 and soon after two cruisers and another monitor.

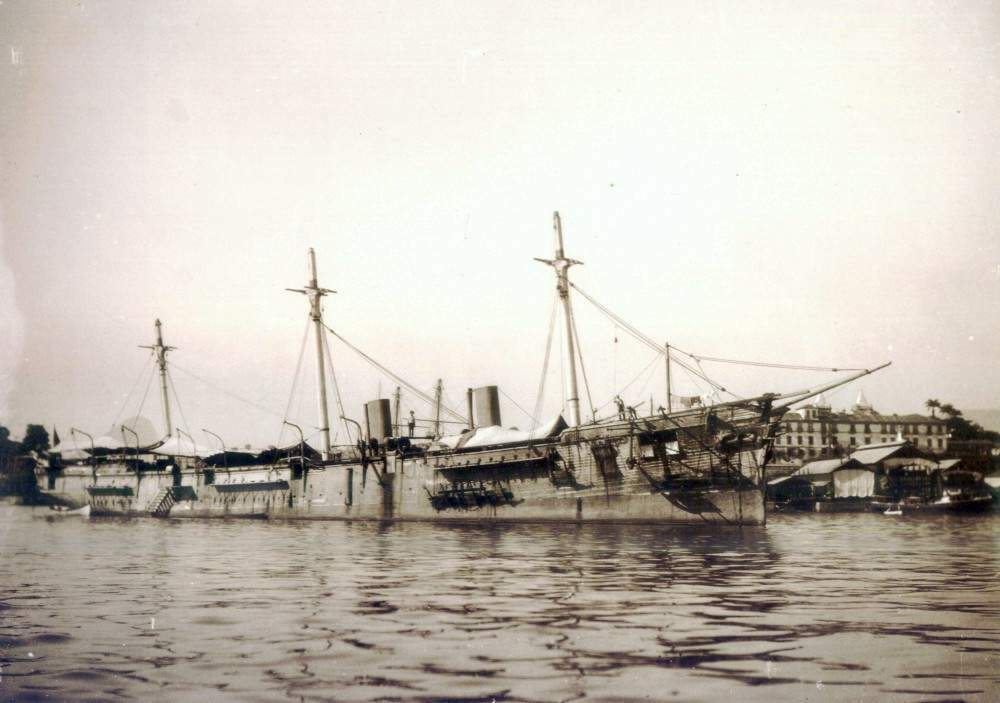
Cruiser and mixed-corvette Trajano in Guanabara Bay, Rio de Janeiro, 1872.

In the 1880s, the navy continued its program of strengthening it, with several Brazilian arsenals building dozens of warships. Four torpedo boats were purchased, the Escola Prática de Torpedos was created for enlisted men, and a workshop for the manufacture and repair of torpedoes and electrical appliances was set up at the Arsenal of the Navy in Rio de Janeiro on November 30, 1883.

However, the apex of the Imperial Navy occurred with the incorporation of the ocean-going battleships Riachuelo and Aquidabã (both equipped with torpedo launchers) in 1884 and 1885, respectively. Obtaining these ships enabled Brazil to remain “among the naval powers of the universe”.

=== Squadron ===
The High Command of the Imperial Navy studied the possibility of putting into practice the tactics employed by the Austrians at the Battle of Lissa in 1866. Even though they were outnumbered (seven battleships and 20 wooden ships with 532 cannons) they managed to impose a defeat on the Italian naval forces (twelve battleships and nineteen wooden ships with 641 cannons). Such tactics demonstrated the domination of the seas by the armored fleets, grouped in squadrons composed of units with a high degree of efficiency in communications and maneuver.

== Ships ==
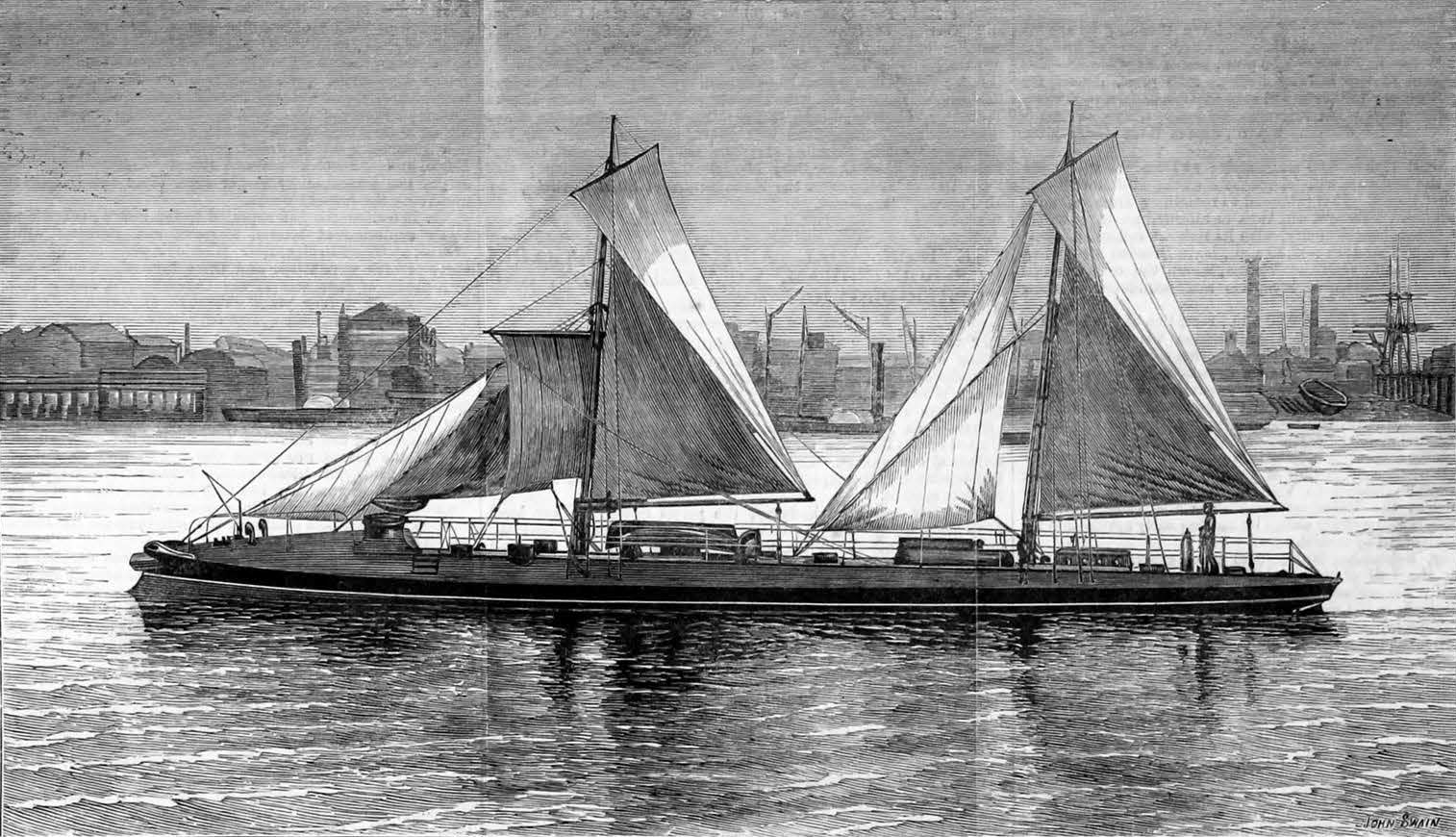
Illustration of a Class No. 1 torpedo boat published by The Engineer, 1882.

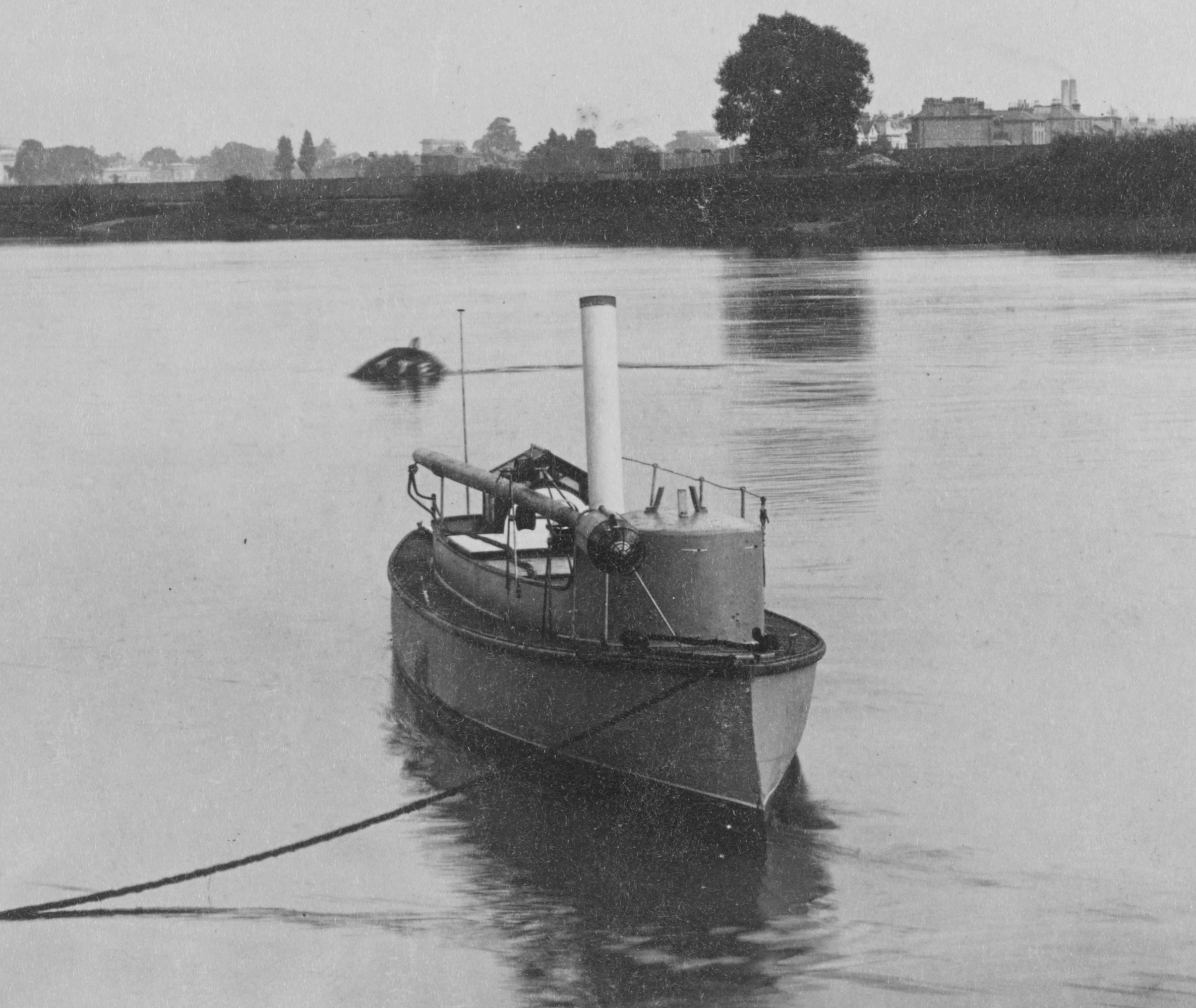
Alfa class launches, built by Thornycroft, 1883.

From 1884 to 1886, the Esquadra de Evolções was composed of:

Battleships
Riachuelo (Flagship); Sete de Setembro; Solimões; Javary
Cruisers
Guanabara; Almirante Barroso; Trajano; Primeiro de Março
Torpedo class No. 1	Torpedo Alfa class
No. 1 No. 2 No. 3 No. 4	Alfa; Beta; Gama

== See also ==
- Brazilian Navy
- Prime Minister of Brazil
