= Brazilian ship Almirante Barroso =

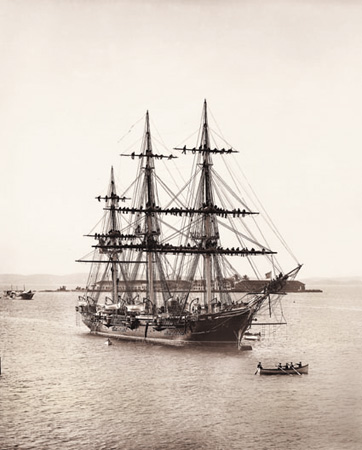
The 1882 cruiser Almirante Barroso

There have been at least three vessels that have served with the Brazilian Navy named Almirante Barroso, after Francisco Manuel Barroso, Baron of Amazonas:

- Brazilian cruiser Almirante Barroso (1882), a cruiser, launched in 1882, sank in 1893 on circumnavigation voyage
- Brazilian cruiser Almirante Barroso (1896), a protected cruiser, launched in 1896, completed in 1897, struck in 1931; similar in many respects to Chilean cruiser Ministro Zenteno (1896); two sister ships were sold to the United States, becoming the New Orleans-class cruiser
- Brazilian cruiser Almirante Barroso (C-11), former USS Philadelphia (CL-41), a Brooklyn-class cruiser sold to Brazil in 1951

== See also ==
- Brazilian ship Barroso
