= Brazilian monitor Solimões (1875) =

Brazilian monitor (warship) sunk in 1892

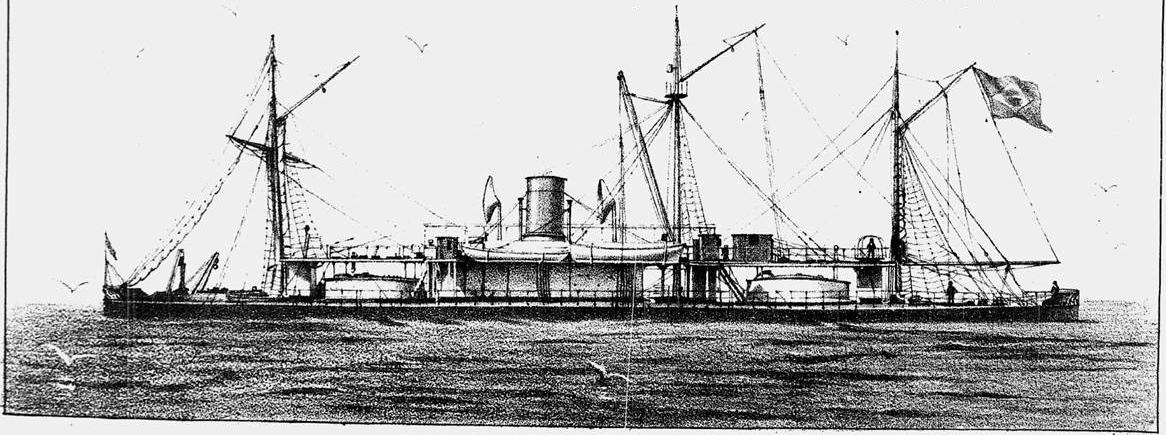

History

Empire of Brazil
- Name: Solimões
- Namesake: Solimões River
- Builder: Société Nouvelle des Forges et Chantiers de la Méditerranée
- Launched: 1875
- Commissioned: 23 April 1875
- Decommissioned: 19 May 1892
- Fate: Sank on May 19, 1892, between Isla de Torre and Isla Encantada, in Uruguay

General characteristics
- Class & type: Javari class, monitor
- Displacement: 3,700 t
- Length: 240 ft (73 m)
- Beam: 58 ft (18 m)
- Draught: 14.6 ft (4.5 m)
- Propulsion: Reciprocating steam engines coupled to two shafts; 2,500 hp (1,900 kW)
- Speed: 9.55 knots (17.69 km/h; 10.99 mph)
- Troops: 135
- Armament: 4 × Whitworth 10 in (250 mm) cannons in two twin turrets; 2 x 1.5 in (37 mm) Nordenfelt cannons; 2 x machine guns
- Armor: Hull; 12 in (300 mm) midships; 7 in (180 mm) fore and aft; 12 in. main towers; 3 in (76 mm) deck; 4 in (100 mm) control tower

Solimões was an armored monitor operated by the Imperial Brazilian Navy. The warship was built at the French shipyard Forges et chantiers de la Méditrranée and launched to sea in 1875, being commissioned on April 23 of that year. She was the most powerful ship of the navy at the time of her incorporation. Solimões had four 254-millimeter (10.0 in) cannons and armor reaching up to 305 millimeters (12.0 in) on the gun turrets. The ship was expected to have good navigation capabilities on the high seas, but had little agility in maneuvering and could not operate in rough seas due to her low side. These characteristics forced the ship to always sail close to shore. The Solimões was part of the Evolution Fleet in 1884, composed of the best ships in the fleet.

In May 1892, she sailed together with other vessels bound for the province of Mato Grosso to help forces loyal to the federal government against separatist rebels. As they approached the Uruguayan coast, the Solimões sank with most of its crew, leaving only five survivors. The circumstances of the sinking were never clarified and caused a public controversy in Brazil. Sabotage was thought to have been committed by the survivors since they all had time to put on their best clothes and coats, collect money, and get into the escape boat. Their narrative was that they were sent by the captain to get help. However, there was not a single officer to command them and there were crew members much more qualified than they were to carry out this order.

== Construction ==
The monitor was built at the Forges et chantiers de la Méditerranée shipyard in La Seyne-sur-Mer, France, between 1874 and 1875. Her construction happened under the supervision of Lieutenant-Captain Carlos Braconnot. The ship was named Solimões after the river of the same name located in the province of Pará. She went through an armament show and incorporation on April 23, 1875. Her first commander was Frigate Captain Miguel de Melo Tamborim. Javari class ships were the largest in the navy when incorporated.

== Characteristics ==
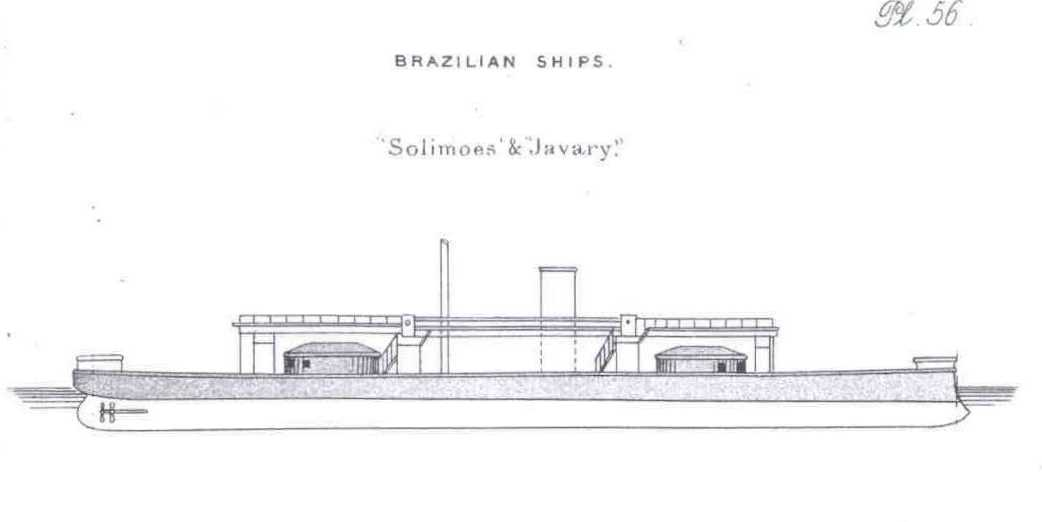
Drawing of the Javary class.

The Solimões had a displacement of 3,700 tons, a length of 240 ft (73 m), a beam of 58 ft (18 m), and a draught of 14.6 ft (4.5 m), two reciprocating steam engines of 2,500 hp (1,900 kW), two propellers, and a maximum speed of 9.55 knots (17.69 km/h; 10.99 mph). Her hull had 12-inch (300 mm) midships; bow and stern, 7-inch (180 mm); main gun turrets, 12-inch; deck, 3-inch (76 mm); and control tower 4-inch (100 mm) armor. The ship had four 10-inch (250 mm) Whitworth cannons mounted in two turrets; two 37 mm (1.5 in) Nordenfelt guns; and two machine guns. The compartments were watertight and located in the bulge of the ship. Solimões had a funnel and three masts, being rigged to the schooner and sailing cloth. Her crew numbered 135 men.

== Service ==
The Solimões and Javary monitors arrived in the Empire of Brazil around 1875. Vessels with great technical and handling capabilities were expected, whether at sea or on the river. The ships' 305-millimeter armor and 254-millimeter cannons were the most powerful in the country at the time. However, reality proved to be just the opposite. With too low freeboards, they could not operate in rough seas, in addition to poor maneuverability and low speed (9.55 knots less than contemporary ships of the same type). Maneuverability was improved in an upgrade between 1880 and 1881 when new rudders were installed, but the ship did not carry out missions on the high seas.

In March 1880, the Solimões had a breakdown in its engines while sailing to Ilha Grande, becoming adrift. Several vessels began searching for the monitor, which was only found on the 17th, about seven miles (11 km) south of Ponta de Caruçu. It was towed to Rio de Janeiro, anchoring on March 25.

On August 19, 1884, by Notice No. 1541-A, the Evolutions Fleet ("Esquadra de Evoluções") was created, the most modern core of the fleet in propulsion, artillery, and torpedoes. It was under the command of counter admiral Artur Silveira de Motta. The Solimões thus became one of sixteen ships in the fleet (the battleships Riachuelo, Sete de Setembro, and Javary; the hybrid cruisers Guanabara and Almirante Barroso; the ocean-going corvettes Trajano, Barroso, and Primeiro de Março; the 1st Class (50 tons) torpedo boats 1, 2, 3, 4 and 5 and the 4th Class (50 t) torpedo boats Alfa, Beta and Gama. Solimões underwent reforms in 1889, receiving an additional wheel and improvements in her armaments.

=== Shipwreck ===
On March 27, 1892, the Solimões was accompanied by the monitor Bahia and both headed to the port of Santos to carry out joint maneuvers. On the way, the commander of the Solimões received the mission, via telegraph, to go to Corumbá, in what was then the province of Mato Grosso, to support the legalists who were fighting a separatist insurrection. For this mission, besides the Solimões, the monitors Bahia and Rio Grande, and the gunboat Carioca were also sent. Due to bad weather, the fleet anchored in the port of Santa Catarina on May 13. (Note: This gap of months is not explained by the source.) Two days later, the weather improved and the fleet resumed its course to Mato Grosso. However, on May 18, bad weather again struck the ships off the coast of Rio Grande do Sul, where the battleship was last sighted. The Solimões sank around 10 pm on May 19, with only five crew members surviving. The events that led to the sinking come from accounts from survivors, without corroboration from third parties.

The Solimões was supposedly in difficulty navigating due to the rough seas caused by a storm. The situation was so severe that the monitor was completely lost. At one point, the ship approached the shore and violently crashed into the reef between Isla de Torre and Isla Encantada, off the Uruguayan coast. The encounter with the reef severely damaged the vessel and Captain Xavier de Castro ordered a group of crew members to go ashore in a boat to ask for help from the nearest authorities. Those chosen were the nurse José Correa Maguena, leader of the group, three sailors, and a stoker, namely Agostinho de Mattos, Correa do Nascimento, Antônio Solimões, and José Luiz. They reported that they did their best to reach the shore when they heard an explosion noise coming from the direction where the monitor was. When they looked, they could no longer see the ship.

According to this report, there was a perforation in the ship where water entered and reached the engines, causing the boilers to explode and sink the ship in a few minutes. This testimony, made in Montevideo, raised suspicions that the group might have sabotaged the ship since it did not make sense to send those sailors, as Solimões had officers and other people more qualified to do it. In addition, it was noticed that the survivors had time to put on their best clothes, and take coats and money. Another point that generated controversy in the survivors' narrative was that they discovered the boat used by the castaways, which had all the equipment to sail. Furthermore, the rope that attached the boat to the ship had signs that it had been cut with a sharp material, instead of being loosed, as it should have been. Finally, if there was an explosion, there should have been debris scattered around the wreck site, which there was not, and the bodies recovered should have had signs of the explosion, but only showed signs of deterioration due to the passage of time.

The survivors arrived in Rio de Janeiro on June 8 and were subjected to an investigation to ascertain the circumstances. They stated exactly the facts they had said in Montevideo, without any new elements being discovered. After that, they were sent to the barracks of the Sailors' Battalion in the Villegagnon fortress to be submitted to the Research Council. However, the real cause of the sinking of the Solimões was never known. The accident caused a huge commotion in Brazil, with the event being widely reported for months.

== See also ==
- List of ships of the Brazilian Navy
- Brazilian monitor Javary
