= Brazilian ship Barroso =

There have been at least two vessels that have served with the Brazilian Navy named Barroso, after Francisco Manuel Barroso, Baron of Amazonas:

- Brazilian ironclad Barroso, an armoured gunboat built in the mid-1860s, decommissioned in 1882, and scrapped in 1937
- Brazilian corvette Barroso (V34), a 2002 corvette, the lead ship of its class

== See also ==
- Brazilian ship Almirante Barroso
