= Brazilian monitor Javary (1874) =

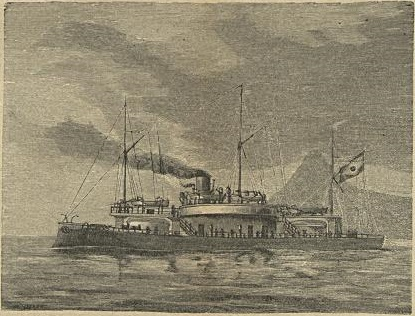
- The Javary sunk by the artillery of Fortaleza de São João (Rio de Janeiro) during the Revolta da Armada.

History

Empire of Brazil
- Name: Javary
- Namesake: Javary River
- Builder: Société Nouvelle des Forges et Chantiers de la Méditerranée
- Launched: 1874
- Commissioned: 1875
- Decommissioned: 22 November 1893
- Fate: Sunk in battle on November 22, 1893, during the Revolta da Armada

General characteristics
- Class & type: Javari-class monitor
- Displacement: 8,160 lb (3,700 t)
- Length: 240 ft (73 m)
- Beam: 17.70 ft (5.39 m)
- Draught: 12.3 ft (3.7 m)
- Propulsion: Reciprocating steam engines coupled to two shafts; 2,500 hp (1,900 kW)
- Speed: 11 knots (20 km/h; 13 mph)
- Troops: 135
- Armament: 4 × Whitworth 10 in (250 mm) cannons in two twin turrets; 2 x 1.5 in (37 mm) Nordenfelt guns; 2 x machine guns
- Armor: Hull; 12 in (300 mm) midships; 7 in (180 mm) fore and aft; 12 in. main towers; 3 in (76 mm) deck; 4 in (100 mm) control tower

Javary was a Javari-class armored monitor operated by the Imperial Brazilian Navy and Brazilian Navy (before and after the Proclamation of the Republic). Her sister ship was the Solimões. She is known for her armor and powerful armaments for the time. Her service was limited by the inadequate draught for certain stretches of river, and her maneuverability was reduced due to an extremely low side, which meant the ship was used mainly as a floating battery. She was sunk after being shot at by the Fortaleza de São João during the Revolta da Armada in 1893.

== Characteristics ==
The idea of building the Javari class emerged after ten years had passed since the construction of the first armored ship of the Empire: Brasil. According to Ribeiro de Luz, "these ironclad battleships would be endowed with all the improvements needed to make them perfect machines for both maritime and river warfare." However, this finding turned out not to be true, as the future battleships proved to be slow and unreliable in open sea due to their excessively low freeboard. Therefore, the ships came to be regarded more as floating batteries in Guanabara Bay than as ships themselves.

The Javary displaced 8,160 lb (3,700 t). Her dimensions were 240 ft. (73 m) in length, 17.7 ft. (5.39 m) of beam, and 13.3 ft. (3.75 m) of draught. The ship's armor was formed by 300-millimeter plates at midships and in the cannon bunkers, 180-millimeter plates in the fore and aft, 76-millimeter plates on the deck, and 100-millimeter plates on the control tower.

Her propulsion was composed of steam engines coupled to two shafts, generating 2,500 horsepower. This allowed Javary to reach a maximum speed of eleven knots. Its armament included four 254-millimeter Whitworth cannons in two double turrets, two 37-millimeter Nordenfelt guns, and two machine guns. Her crew consisted of 135 men. These characteristics made Javary and Solimões, ships of the same class (Javary), the best protected and armed ships in the entire fleet, although they were not the most maneuverable and fastest.

== Service history ==
The monitor was built at the Forges et chantiers de la Méditerranée shipyard in Le Havre, France, arriving in Brazil in 1876. Her construction faced opposition from the first commander of the ship, the Frigate Captain José Marques Guimarães. After conducting sea trials, and performing engine and steering tests, the captain judged the results to be unsatisfactory, facing criticism from those involved in her construction. He refused to make the crossing to Brazil and was replaced by Frigate Captain João Antônio Alves Nogueira. The ship was named Javary after the river of the same name located in the Pará Province. When incorporated, together with her sister ship Solimões, she was the largest ship in the Brazilian armada.

On August 19, 1884, she was incorporated into the Evolutions Fleet, a core of the best ships of the Navy in propulsion, artillery, and torpedoes. Created by Notice no. 1541A, from the then Minister of Navy Business, Admiral Joaquim Raimundo de Lamare, the Evolutions Fleet had as its first commander the Counter admiral Arthur Silveira da Mota, Baron of Jaceguai. The fleet was formed by 16 ships among battleships, cruisers, and torpedo boats.

Days before the signing of the Lei Áurea that abolished slavery in Brazil, there was a popular mobilization headed by journalists to raise funds for the purchase of the gold feather that would be used on the occasion. Members of the Javary crew sent a short text in support of the mobilization since they wanted to put their participation in this event on record.

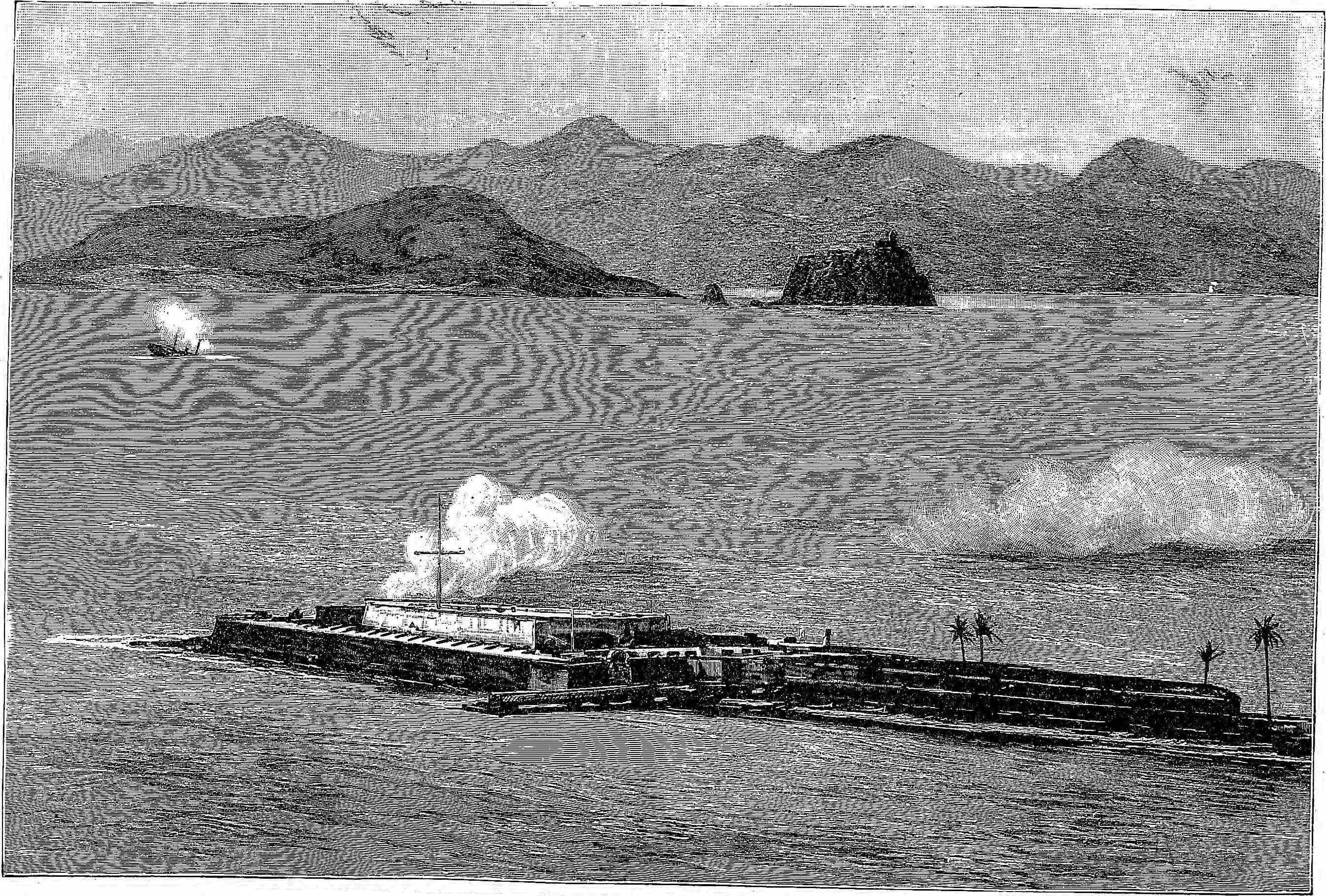
View of the Fortress of Villegaignon (Fortaleza de São Francisco Xavier da Ilha de Villegagnon) held by rebel forces: the sinking vessel is the Javary Monitor (The Graphic, 06/01/1894)

During the Revolta da Armada, Javary was heavily involved in the mutiny. The ship was responsible for defending the main armory from the rebels (Ponta da Armação). She lost her engines, remaining anchored between Ponta do Calabouço and Villegagnon Island, in the Guanabara Bay, when she began an exchange of fire with the fortresses of Barra do Rio de Janeiro.

The shots, probably coming from the Fortaleza de São João, hit her at the stern through her hull, causing an opening through which water began to seep in. The tugboat Vulcano tried to move Javary to a safer position where repairs could be made, but this proved impossible to accomplish given the continuous damage the monitor was suffering. She sank slowly, with her main cannons firing until it was no longer possible. Her sinking allowed for the taking of Ponta da Armação.

Later reports concluded that the cause of the penetration of the shots, which should not have been possible given its armor, was caused by the poor condition the ship was in at the time of the collision and the shaking generated by the firing of the monitor's own 254-millimeter cannons.

== See also ==
- List of ships of the Brazilian Navy
