= Brazilian monitor Solimões =

Brazilian monitor Solimões may refer to one of several monitors of the Brazilian Navy:

- Brazilian monitor Solimões (1875), a French-built monitor that wrecked off Cape Polonio, Uruguay, on 21 May 1892 with the loss of 125
- Brazilian monitor Solimões (1913), a British-built Javary-class monitor; refused by the Brazilian Navy because of financial setbacks in the Brazilian economy; purchased by the British Royal Navy after the outbreak of World War I and became HMS Severn; sold for ship breaking in 1921
