= Monument to Admiral Barroso =

Memorial in Rio de Janeiro, Brazil

- Monumento ao Almirante Barroso
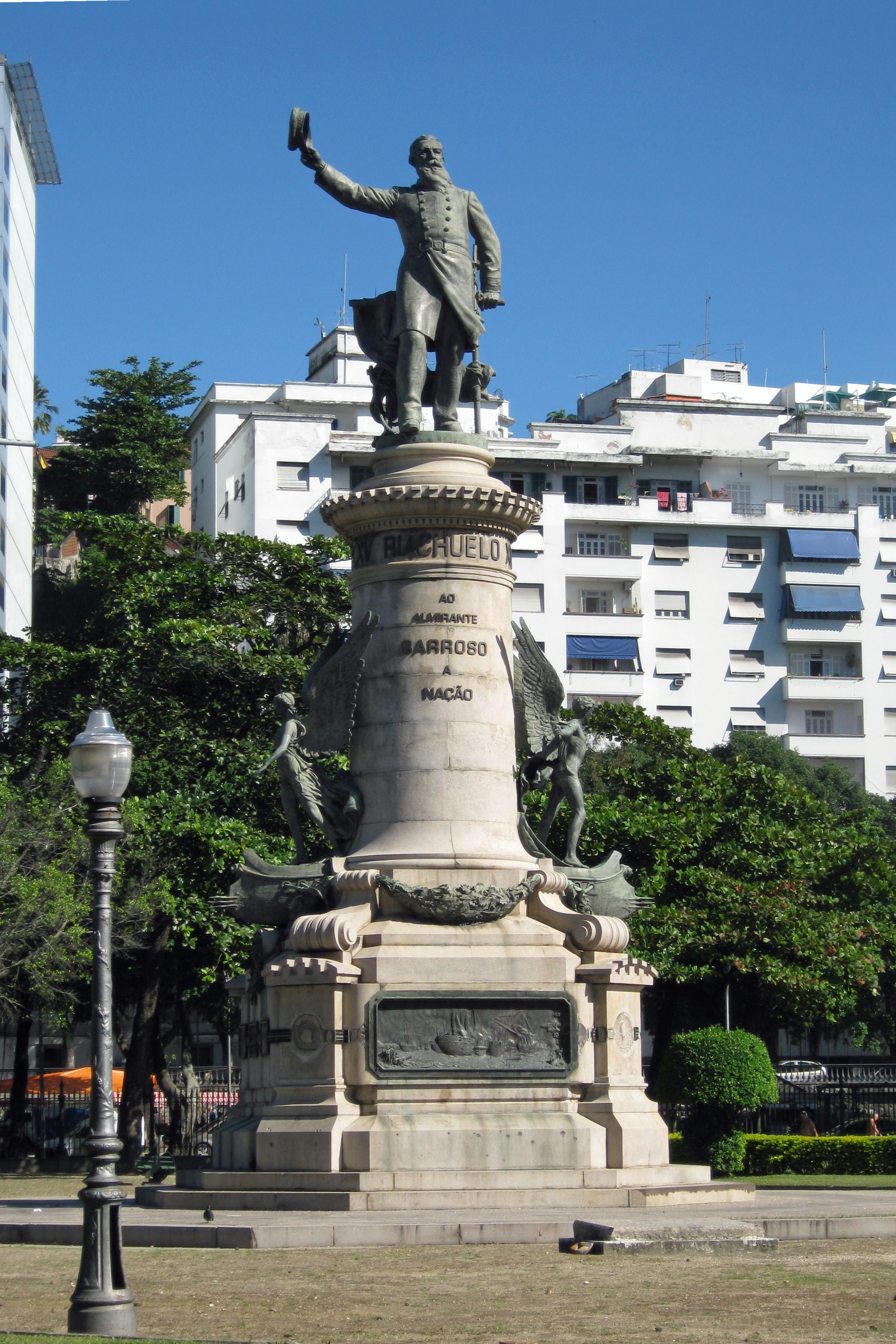
- Interactive map of Monument to Admiral Barroso
- Location: Rio de Janeiro, Brazil
- Coordinates: 22°55′07″S 43°10′33″W
- Designer: José Otávio Correia Lima
- Material: Bronze
- Beginning date: 1909
- Dedicated to: Francisco Manuel Barroso

The Monument to Admiral Barroso is an artistic work by Brazilian sculptor José Otávio Correia Lima made in 1909, which honors admiral Francisco Manuel Barroso, the Baron of Amazonas, and his subordinates who died in the Battle of Riachuelo. Correia Lima won a competition held by the Ministry of Justice for the construction of the statue, which is located in the Paris Square, between the districts of Glória and Lapa, in Rio de Janeiro. The statue was built in bronze; it is supported by a masonry support lined with white granite that has inscribed the names of the main vessels involved in the battle and images of officers who died in it.
