= Brazilian cruiser Almirante Barroso (1896) =

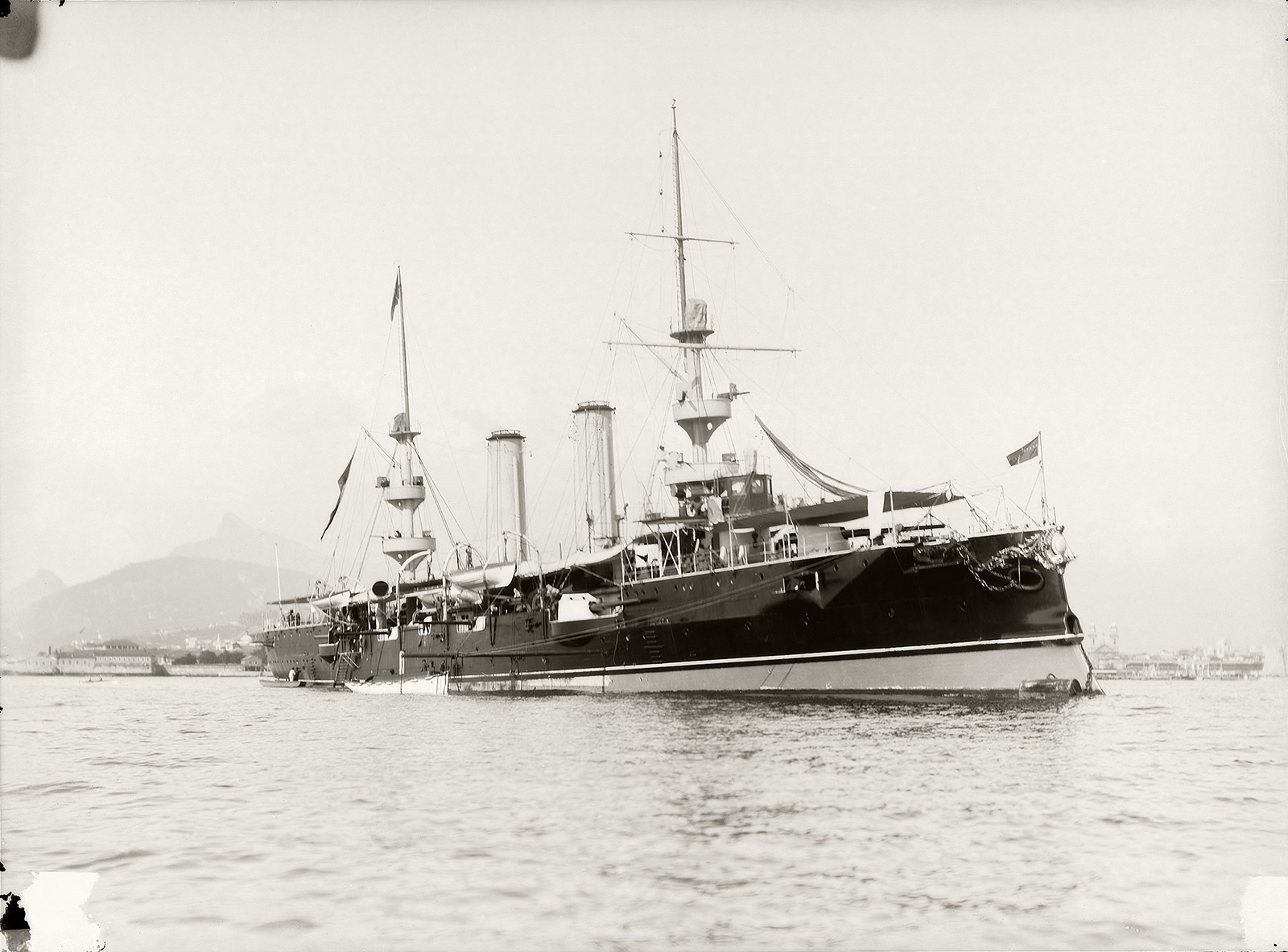
- Picture by Marc Ferrez

History

Brazil
- Name: Almirante Barroso
- Namesake: Francisco Manuel Barroso
- Ordered: Brazil
- Builder: Armstrong Whitworth & Co.
- Laid down: September 1895
- Launched: 25 August 1896
- Commissioned: 25 August 1896
- Decommissioned: 28 July 1931
- Fate: Scrapped

General characteristics
- Class & type: Protected cruiser
- Displacement: 3,437 tons
- Length: 107.98 m (354 ft 3 in)
- Beam: 13.10 m (43 ft 0 in)
- Depth: 7.74 m (25.4 ft)
- Installed power: 7,512 hp
- Propulsion: 2 triple expansion engines, 2 shafts
- Speed: 22 knots (41 km/h; 25 mph)
- Complement: 389
- Armament: 6 × 1 – 152mm Armstrong; 4 × 1 120mm Armstrong; 10 × 1 – 57mm Nordenfelt; 6 × 1 – 37mm Nordenfelt

Almirante Barroso was a protected cruiser operated by the Brazilian Navy between 1896 and 1931. It was the first Brazilian ship to have radio telegraphy. It represented Brazil in Argentina and Chile, in addition to other commissions. It was one of the government ships that faced the rebels in the Revolt of the Lash. It was decommissioned in 1931.

== Construction and design ==
Almirante Barroso was built at the Armstrong Whitworth & Co. shipyards in Elswick, England. The keel was laid in September 1895 and the launch and commissioning took place on 25 August 1896. It was the third vessel to bear the name Almirante Barroso, in honor of admiral Francisco Manuel Barroso, Baron of Amazonas.

The ship was constructed with 5/8 inch steel plates. It had 14 watertight compartments, an armored deck, a Cofferdam-type armored belt to protect vital areas, a double hull, a battering ram and two masts. It displaced 3,437 t and measured 107.989 m in total length; 100.580 m in length between perpendiculars; 13.330 m of external beam; 13.101 m of moulded beam; 7.742 m of depth; 4.990 m of frontal draft; 5.527 m of draft amidships; 5.257 m of draft aft. Its propulsion system consisted of two Humprheis triple-expansion machines, 7,512 HP, which drove two three-blade propellers and propelled the ship at a maximum speed of 22 knots. It had an economic speed range of 5,500 miles.

It had six 152 mm Armstrong guns. Four 120 mm Armstrong guns, two on each side between the main guns. Ten 57 mm Maxim Nordenfelt guns, located fore to aft; six rapid-firing 37 mm Maxim Nordenfelt cannons located on the mast platforms. It had nine vessels: a steam launch; a rowing boat; four longboats; two canoes; a boat; a punt, plus 27 life jackets and 19 buoys, for a garrison of 389 men.

== History ==
Almirante Barroso was the first Brazilian vessel to have radiotelegraphy, thus promoting the first experiences with this system in the country. In 1900, it was part of the White Division together with the battleship Riachuelo and the cruiser Tamoyo, responsible for taking the then president Campos Sales to Argentina in return for the same gesture by Argentine president Julio Argentino Roca. Among some of its commissions, a trip to Chile in 1903 stands out, in return for the visit of ships from that nation to Brazil. In 1904, it was the flagship of the Northern Naval Division, in Manaus, during a period of tension between Brazil and Peru over border issues. During the Aquidabã disaster in 1906, it helped to rescue the shipwrecked, wounded and dead. In 1908, it brought back the remains of admirals Barroso and Saldanha da Gama from Uruguay. At the time of the Revolt of the Lash, in 1910, Almirante Barroso was among the vessels that faced the mutineers, but its firepower and that of the other loyalist ships was negligible compared to just one of the rebels' dreadnoughts. It was considered by the navy to be an outstanding ship, "for its impeccable presentation and for the rigor and discipline, order and efficiency maintained on board". The vessel was in active service until 28 July 1931.

== See also ==
- List of historical ships of the Brazilian Navy

== Bibliography ==
- Marinha do Brasil. "Barroso Cruzador" (PDF). Diretoria do Patrimônio Histórico e Documentação da Marinha.
- Love, Joseph LeRoy (2012). The Revolt of the Whip. Stanford: Stanford University Press. OCLC 787844594.
- Morgan, Zachary R. (2014). Legacy of the lash: race and corporal punishment in the Brazilian Navy. Bloomington: Indiana University Press. OCLC 892699882.
