= Fortress of São João (Rio de Janeiro) =

16th-century star fort in Brazil

Fortress of São João da Barra
- Fortaleza de São João da Barra
- Rio de Janeiro, Rio de Janeiro in Brazil
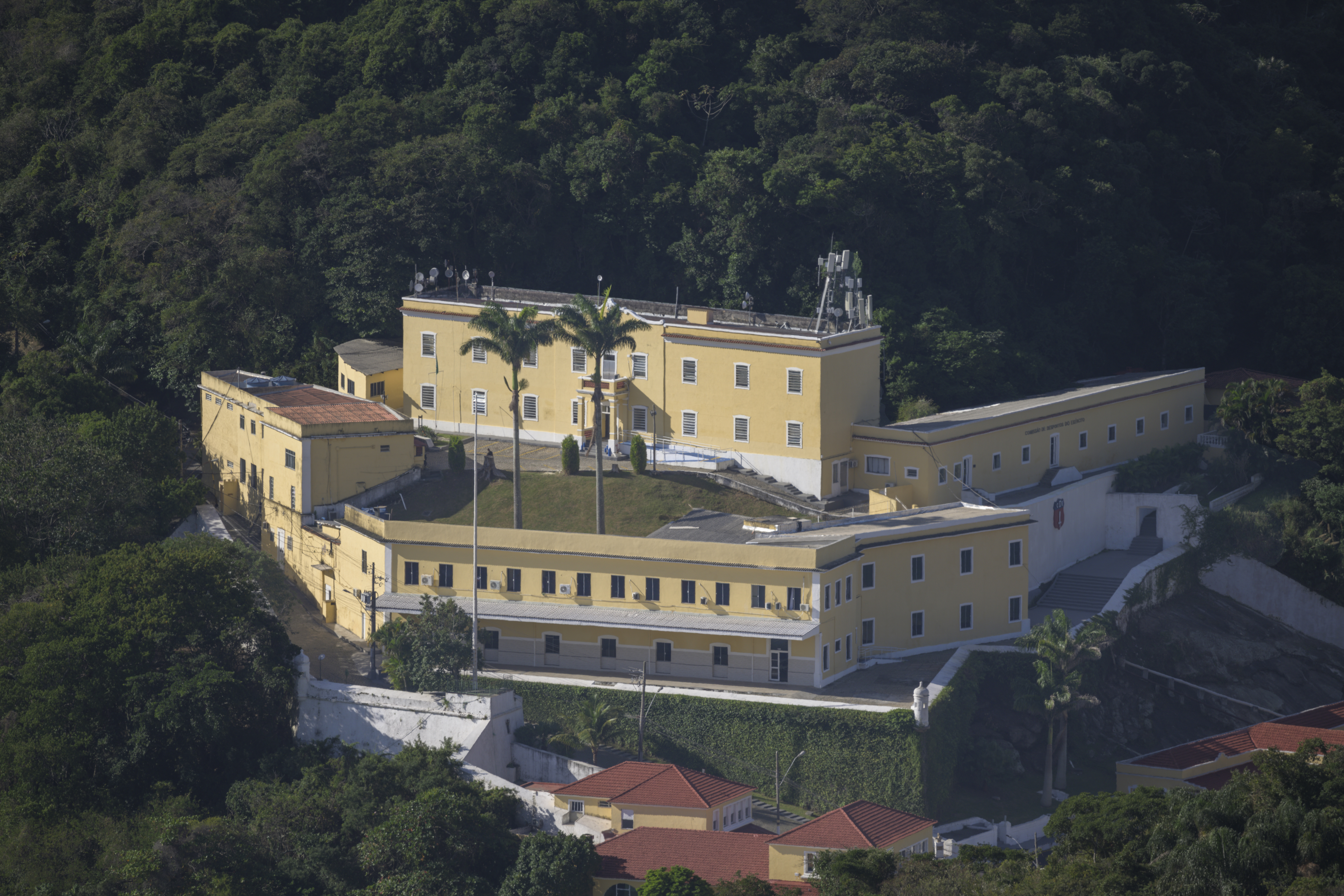
- Fortress of São João as seen from Urca hill, 2024

Site information
- Type: Bastion fort
- Owner: Brazilian Armed Forces
- Open to the public: Yes
- Condition: Intact

Location
- Location in Brazil
- Coordinates: 22.943372°S 43.156458°W

Site history
- Built: 1565
- Built by: Estácio de Sá
- In use: 1991

The Fortress of São João da Barra do Rio de Janeiro (Portuguese: Fortaleza de São João da Barra do Rio de Janeiro), commonly known as the Fortress of São João or São João Fort, is a 16th-century star fort in the present-day Urca neighborhood of Rio de Janeiro, erected by Estácio de Sá to protect Guanabara Bay from French invasion.

== History ==
The original fort was built in 1565 under King Sebastian of Portugal. An expanded and improved structure was put into service in 1618, consisting of four batteries (São José, São Martinho, São Teodósio, and São Diogo). Its armaments were greatly reduced, and not manned, during Brazil's regency period, but emperor Pedro II ordered the fort completely renovated in 1872, and it was equipped with a complement of guns, bunkers, and batteries, including fifteen Whitworth cannons. It was manned as a coastal artillery installation until 1991.

In 1930, the Brazilian Army's Centro Militar de Educação Física (created in 1922) was transferred to the Fortaleza de São João. This establishment was renamed Interlanguage link multi|Escola de Educação Física do Exército|pt in 1933 and continues to be based at the Fortaleza de São João, together with the directorate to which it is subordinated, the Diretoria de Pesquisa e Estudos de Pessoal, since the latter's creation in 2002.
