= Artur Silveira da Mota, Baron of Jaceguai =

Brazilian admiral

Baron of Jaceguai
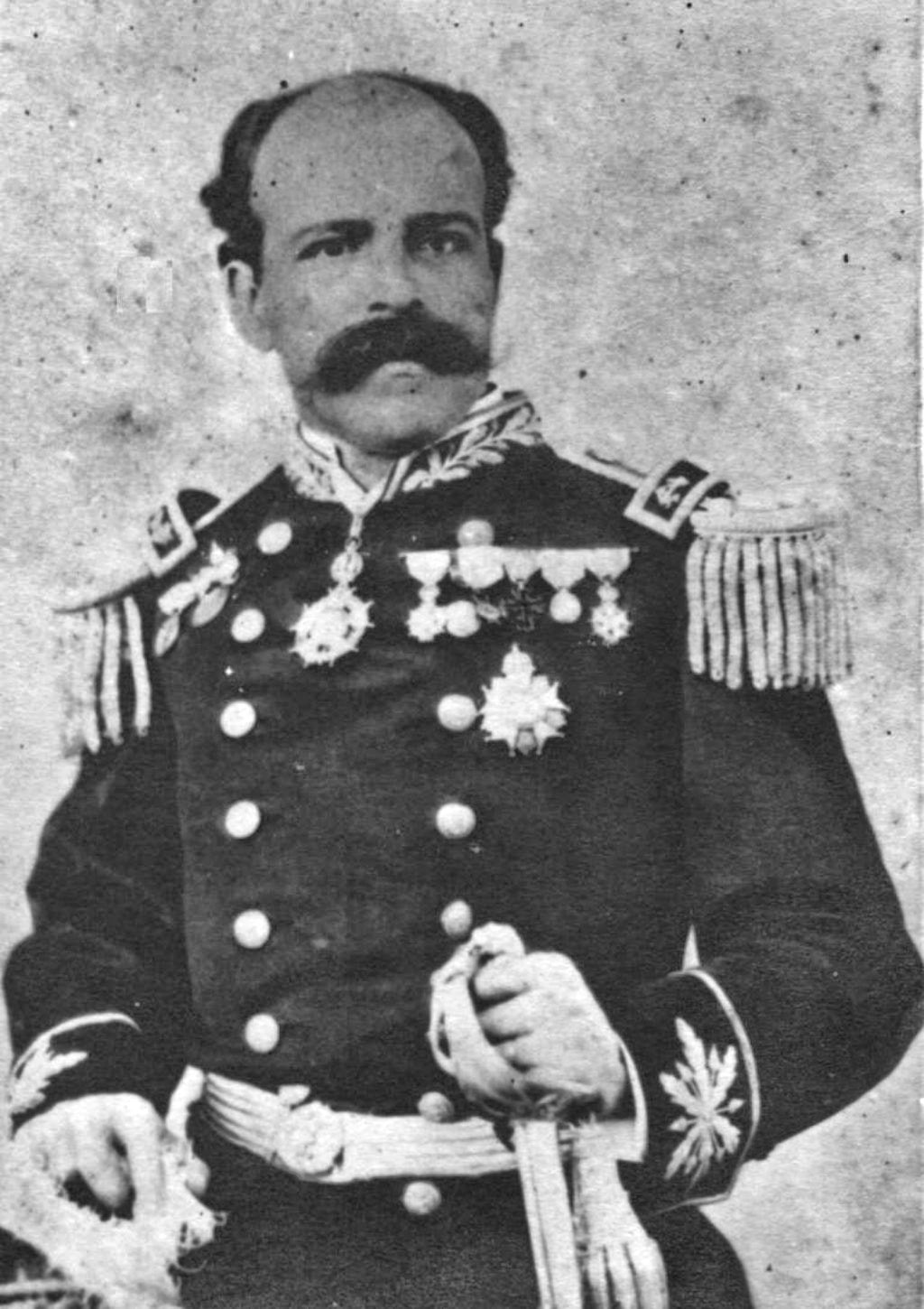
- Born: 26 May 1843; São Paulo, Empire of Brazil
- Died: 6 June 1914 (aged 71); Rio de Janeiro, Brazil
- Military career
- Allegiance: Empire of Brazil; First Brazilian Republic
- Branch: Imperial Brazilian Navy; Brazilian Navy
- Rank: Admiral
- Conflicts: Paraguayan War; Passage of Humaitá

Artur Silveira da Mota, Baron of Jaceguai (Note: In the old spelling Arthur Silveira da Motta, Baron of Jaceguay. Often called Artur Jaceguai or Arthur Jaceguay.) (26 May 1843 — 6 June 1914) was a Brazilian admiral, noble and writer. Mota fought in the Paraguayan War. He was an immortal of the Brazilian Academy of Letters.

== Biography ==
=== Early life ===
The son of José Inácio Siqueira da Mota, Mota was born in São Paulo on 26 May 1843. At the age of fourteen he moved to Rio de Janeiro with his father who had just been appointed senator for the Goiás province. In Rio de Janeiro he joined the Colégio Vitória to later join the Naval School, which he did on 4 March 1858, as an aspirant of guarda-marinha, completing the course in 1860.

After the notorious wreck of the Brazilian corvette Isabel near the cape Spartel in 1860 that killed most of its crew, his father tried to persuade him into joining the army and even managed to get into contact with the Minister of War in order to facilitate the process, but Mota refused, continuing his career in the navy.

In 1851 he went on his first training trip aboard the corvette Baiana under the command of captain José Maria Rodrigues. On that occasion, he visited England, France, Spain, the coast of Africa and the United States. On 2 December 1852, he was promoted to 2nd lieutenant, being appointed hydrography instructor of the class of guarda-marinhas, who were on their long-haul instruction trip aboard the frigate Constituição. Mota was promoted to 1st Lieutenant when he returned to Brazil from that trip on 28 December 1863.

=== Paraguayan War ===
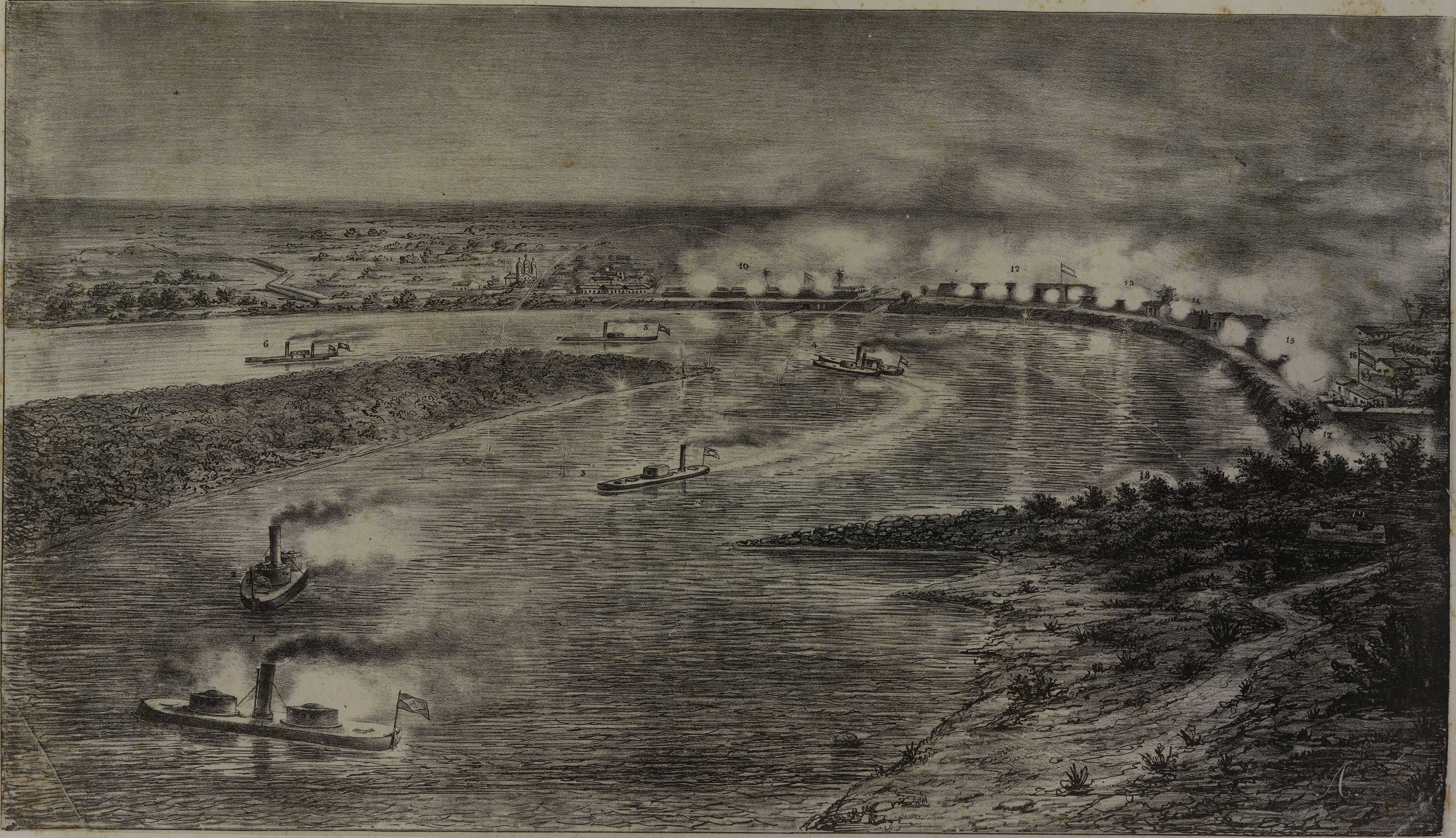
Passage of Humaitá

On 20 February 1865 Mota headed south to join the Río de la Plata fleet to begin naval operations in the ongoing Paraguayan War. There, on the 27th, the Viscount of Tamandaré, commander-in-chief of the Brazilian naval forces in the Río de la Plata, appointed him as his personal secretary and aide-de-camp.

About this appointment, senator Francisco Otaviano would later say in a speech in the Senate's tribune:

"When I had the honor of going on a diplomatic commission to the Río de la Plata, in times of war, I saw the proven and praiseworthy admiral Tamandaré accompany himself to the theater of operations of a very young lieutenant, taking him as secretary. This surprised me; but for the time ahead, communicating enough with this young officer, I recognized that the noble admiral had had a happy eye.

It did not surprise me that this young man had bravery and loyalty, which are qualities of the noble profession of the man of the sea. No wonder he, so unripe from the years (he was no more than 20 years old), when others were looking to have fun, had dedicated himself to the study of all the scientific fields that today are necessary for the naval officer commanding a ship, and much more for who, trusting himself, was already preparing for the higher positions of the fleet.

But what amazed me about this young officer was the discretion, the good advice with which he rendered services on critical occasions so relevant to me and the admiral, services that do not appear on the official reports, but that we, public men, know how to recognize. Two years later he was chosen by the Marquis of Caxias and the Viscount of Inhaúma for the most honorable and most brilliant mission that a Brazilian naval officer has ever had, I dare say, the vanguard post in the passage of Humaitá".

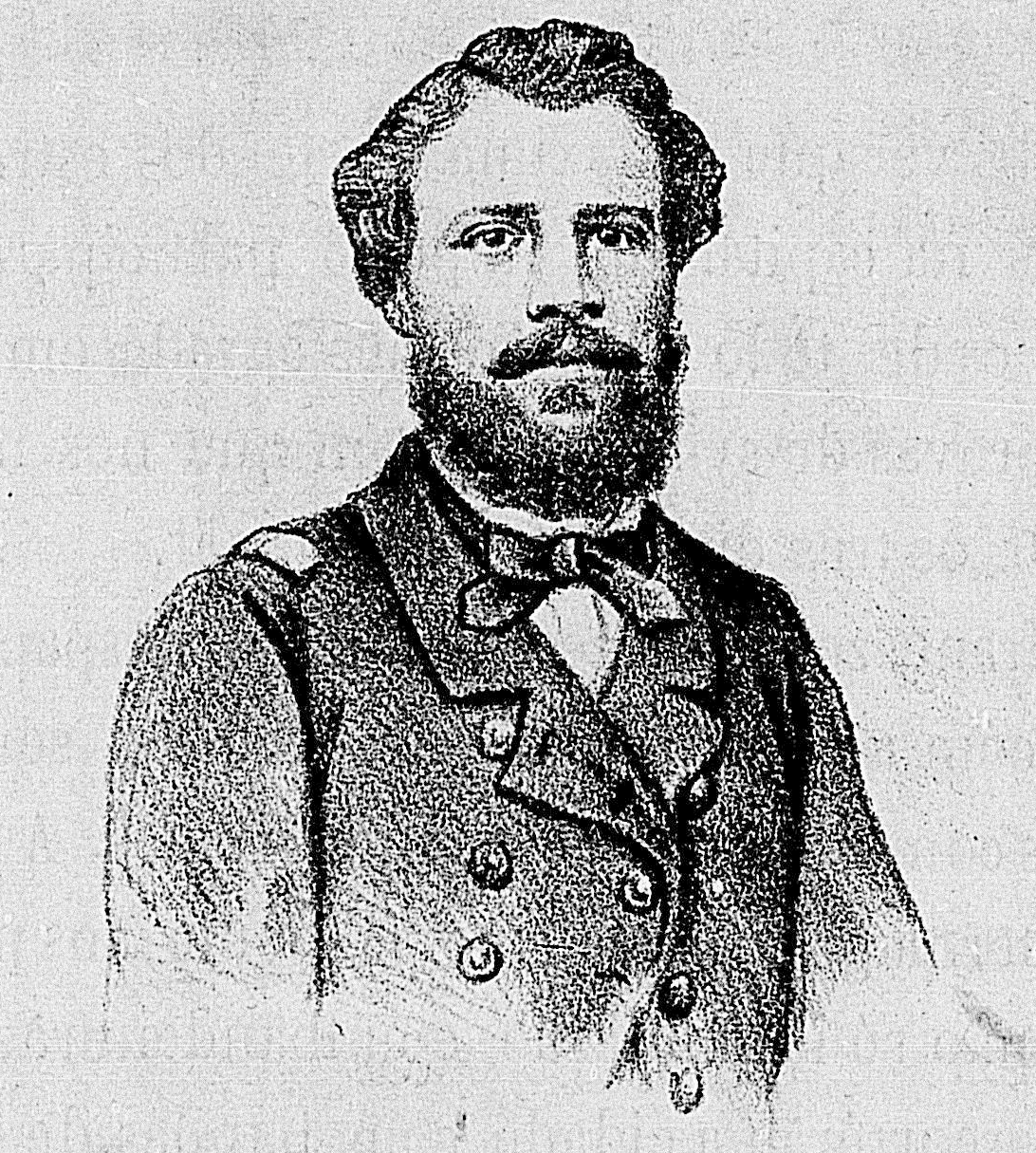
Artur Silveira da Mota, lithography by Angelo Agostini, c. 1868.

On 13 July 1867 he assumed command of the gunboat Ivaí. The Marquis of Caxias sent him to Rio de Janeiro on a private and special mission to the Emperor. Mota did his job with discretion and finesse and, on his return to the theater of war, was appointed commander of the ironclad Barroso. He took a prominent part in the battle of Curupayty. The trust Caxias and Inhaúma had for him put him on some of the most risky and difficult missions. In one of them, in Humaitá, Mota accomplished the greatest feat of his life forcing the very dangerous passage of the river, under the relentless fire of Paraguayan batteries.

=== Later years ===
When the Paraguayan War ended in 1870 Mota was 26 years old and was already captain at sea. He was appointed commander of the armoured corvette Nichteroy, then the largest ship in the Brazilian fleet, and set out on a long-distance instruction trip, commanding guarda-marinhas and officers, along the northern coast of Brazil.

A student of naval issues, Mota was concerned with the system to be adopted in the Brazilian navy. He was a supporter of the Armstrong system, which opposed the Whitworth, and at public conferences, some of which were attended by the emperor Pedro II, he defended his point of view. After experimenting on the subject, according to Mota's indications, the Brazilian Navy adopted the Armstrong system.

In 1873, after leaving the command of the corvette Nichteroy, Mota was sent to command a permanent scientific commission, with the purpose not only of completing a general survey of the coast of Brazil and of the Platine republics, but also of providing theoretical and practical exercises to officers who were still inexperienced. Later he was appointed naval attaché to the Brazilian legations in all European courts, receiving the particular task of studying the naval organization of these countries. In December 1878, he was promoted to the post of head-of-division and, in the following year, he was appointed Extraordinary Envoy and Plenipotentiary Minister on a special mission in China. He went aboard the corvette Vital de Oliveira. Upon his return, he was chosen to remodel the Rio de Janeiro navy shipyard. In 1882 he was promoted to chief-of-squadron of the Esquadra de Evoluções, a post that corresponds to today's rear admiral, and received the title of Baron de Jaceguai.

In 1887 he asked for retirement, an act that provoked vehement appeals from his comrades and friends. Away from active service, he did not completely abandon the profession he loved so much. In 1897, he was appointed director of the Navy Library, Museum and Archive, and editor of the Revista Marítima Brasileira magazine. In 1900 he was appointed director of the Naval School, where he carried out a major program of administration.

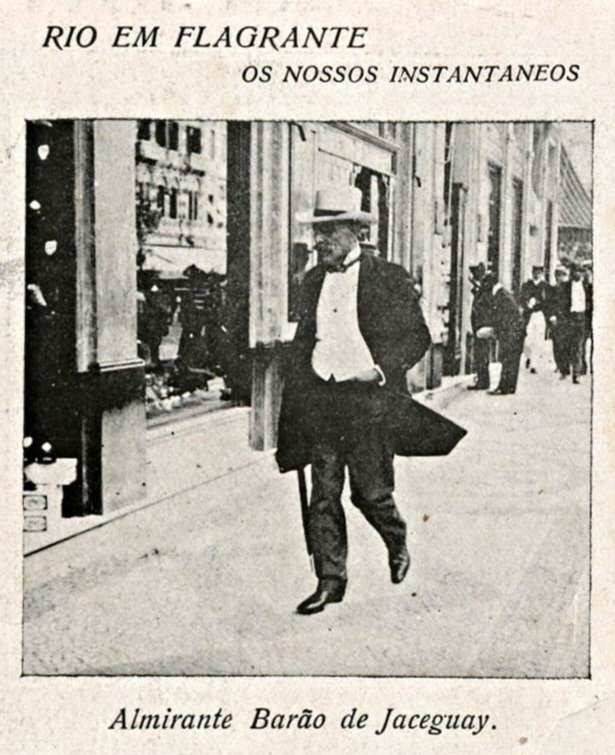
Walking through downtown Rio de Janeiro in 1908

Mota applied for the Brazilian Academy of Letters in 1907, encouraged by Joaquim Nabuco, with the idea that the academy should represent, in its roster, the entirety of Brazilian intellectuals and not just aspects of national literary activity. In his inaugural speech, Mota did not praise his predecessor, Teixeira de Melo, claiming he "had not known the man or his work". Goulart de Andrade, who succeeded him at the academy, believed to have found another explanation for this silence: in the national Ephemerides, when reporting the passage of Humaitá in the Brazilian squadron, Teixeira de Melo mentioned the name of the commander of the division, Delfim Carlos de Carvalho, later Baron of Passagem, omitting that of the Barroso commander, Artur Silveira da Mota.

Mota finally retired on 15 February 1911. He died three years later, suffering with arteriosclerosis, on 6 June 1914.

== Bibliography ==
- Jaceguai, Artur (2011). Reminiscências da guerra do Paraguai (in Portuguese). Brasilia: Senado Federal. ISBN 978-85-7018-346-0.
