= Brazilian ironclad Sete de Setembro =

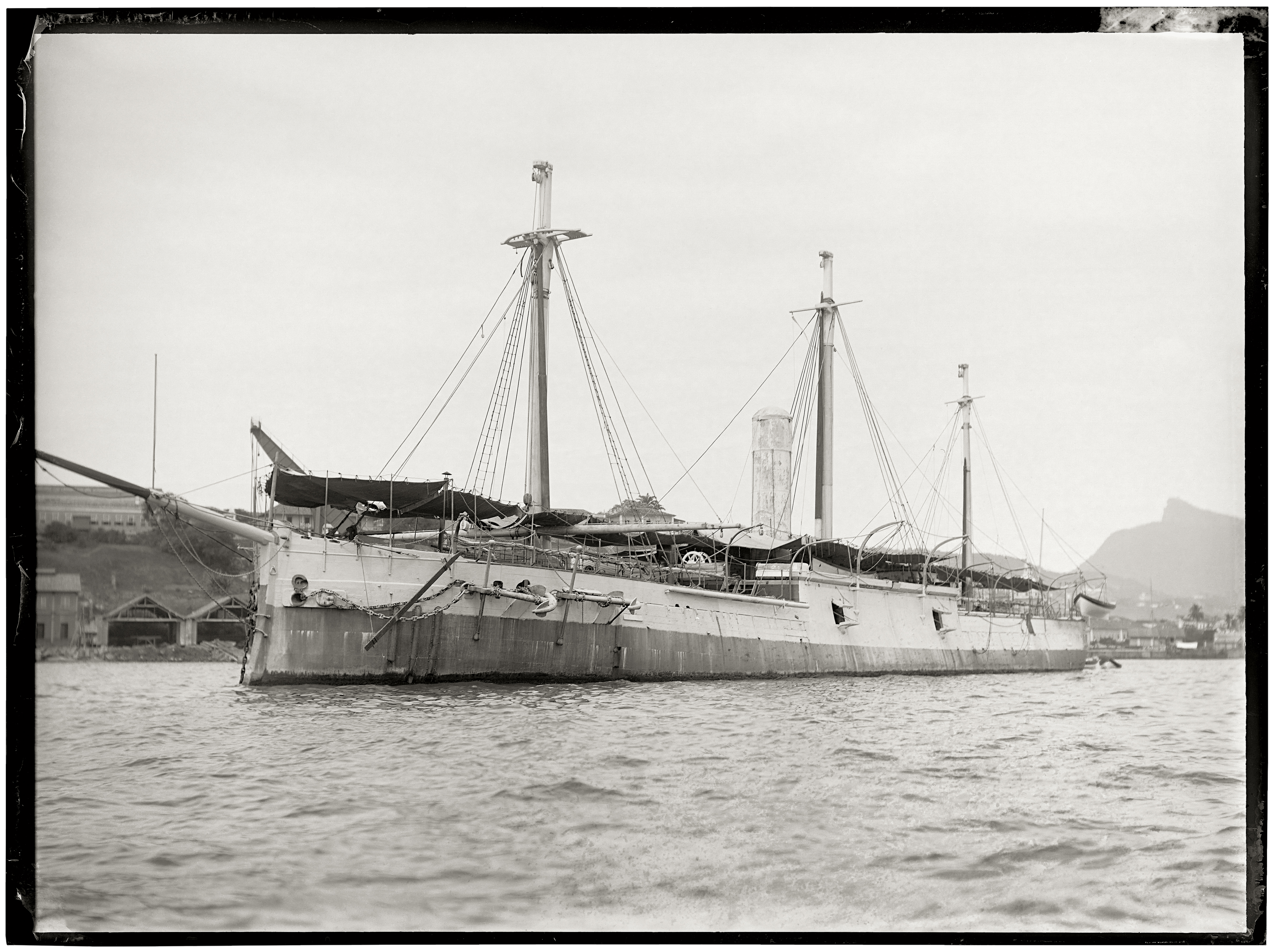
- The ironclad Sete de Setembro

Class overview
- Operators: Imperial Brazilian Navy
- Succeeded by: None
- Built: 1868–74
- In commission: 1874–93
- Completed: 1
- Lost: 1

History

Empire of Brazil
- Name: Sete de Setembro
- Namesake: Sete de Setembro
- Builder: Arsenal de Marinha da Corte, Rio de Janeiro
- Laid down: 8 January 1868
- Launched: 16 May 1874
- Completed: 4 July 1874
- Reclassified: floating battery, 1879
- Fate: Sank after fire, 16 December 1893

General characteristics
- Type: Armored frigate
- Displacement: 2,174 metric tons (2,140 long tons)
- Length: 73.4 m (240 ft 10 in)
- Beam: 14.2 m (46 ft 7 in)
- Draft: 3.81 m (12.5 ft) (mean)
- Installed power: 2,000 ihp (1,500 kW)
- Propulsion: 2 shafts, 2 steam engines, 4 boilers
- Speed: 12 knots (22 km/h; 14 mph)
- Complement: 185 officers and men
- Armament: 4 × 300-pounder Whitworth muzzle-loading rifled guns
- Armor: Belt: 114 mm (4.5 in); Casemate: 114 mm (4.5 in); Deck: 12.7 mm (0.50 in)

The Brazilian ironclad Sete de Setembro was a wooden-hulled armored frigate built for the Imperial Brazilian Navy during the Paraguayan War in the late 1860s. Construction was delayed by a debate over her armament and she was not completed until 1874, by which time the ship was essentially obsolete. Sete de Setembro was transferred to Rio de Janeiro in the 1880s and captured by the rebels during the Fleet Revolt of 1893–94. She sank after she caught fire when the government forces recaptured her in late 1893.

== Design and description ==
Sete de Setembro was designed as an enlarged, and seaworthy, version of the casemate ironclad Barroso as part of the 1867 Naval Program, but she was ultimately classified as an armored frigate. Before construction began weather decks were added fore and aft to improve seaworthiness and protect the capstans fore and aft. The hull was sheathed with Muntz metal to reduce biofouling and a bronze ram, 2.4 meters (7 ft 10 in) long, was fitted. For sea passages the ship's freeboard could be increased to 3.2 meters (10 ft 6 in) by use of removable bulwarks 1.1 meters (3 ft 7 in) high.

The ship measured 73.4 meters (240 ft 10 in) long overall, with a beam of 14.2 meters (46 ft 7 in) and she had a mean draft of 3.81 meters (12 ft 6 in). Sete de Setembro normally displaced 2,174 metric tons (2,140 long tons). Her crew numbered 185 officers and men.

=== Propulsion ===
Sete de Setembro had two John Penn & Sons 2-cylinder steam engines, each of which drove a single 3.7-meter (12 ft 2 in) propeller. They were powered by four rectangular boilers that produced a total of 2,000 indicated horsepower (1,500 kW) which gave the ship a maximum speed of 12 knots (22 km/h; 14 mph). The ship's funnel was mounted in the middle of her casemate and she carried a maximum of 263 long tons (267 t) of coal.

=== Armament ===
Two choices were debated for the ship's armament. The first was for six muzzle-loading 150-pounder Whitworth guns mounted in a central casemate with the end guns pivoting to fire either fore or aft. The second option was for two gun turrets, each mounting a pair of 300-pounder Whitworth guns. A compromise was reached with a casemate armed with four 300-pounder Whitworth guns on pivot mounts at the corners. A new controversy arose, however, over the choice of Whitworth guns as the navy preferred Armstrong weapons. A decision in favor of the Whitworth guns was finally made after a debate of several years, which delayed the completion of the ship. The 9-inch (229 mm) solid shot of the Whitworth gun weighed approximately 300 pounds (136.1 kg) while the gun itself weighed 18 long tons (18 t).

=== Armor ===
Sete de Setembro had a complete wrought iron waterline belt that was 3.04 meters (10.0 ft) high and had a maximum thickness of 114 millimeters (4 in). The ship's deck and the roof of the casemate was protected with 12.7 millimeters (0.5 in) of wrought iron. The casemate was armored identically as the hull and both were backed by 593 millimeters (23.3 in) of wood.

== Service ==
Sete de Setembro was laid down at the Arsenal de Marinha da Corte in Rio de Janeiro on 8 January 1868, during the late stages of the Paraguayan War (also known as the War of the Triple Alliance), which saw Argentina, Uruguay and Brazil allied against Paraguay. She was launched on 16 May 1874, after lengthy delays as to her armament, and commissioned on 4 July 1874 by which time she was obsolete. She was briefly placed into reserve between August 1876 and June 1877. The ship was stationed in Montevideo during the early 1880s before she was transferred to Rio de Janeiro in 1884. Sete de Setembro was assigned to the Evolution Squadron in November 1885 despite having been reclassified in 1879 as a floating battery by virtue of her weak armor and lack of compartmentalization. By 1893, however, her engines had been removed and she was captured by the rebels during the Fleet Revolt of 1893–94. They had her towed to a position near Armação Beach to be used as a stationary guard post. The ship was recaptured on 16 December 1893, but she sank after catching fire.

== See also ==
- List of historical ships of the Brazilian Navy
