= Brazilian cruiser Trajano =

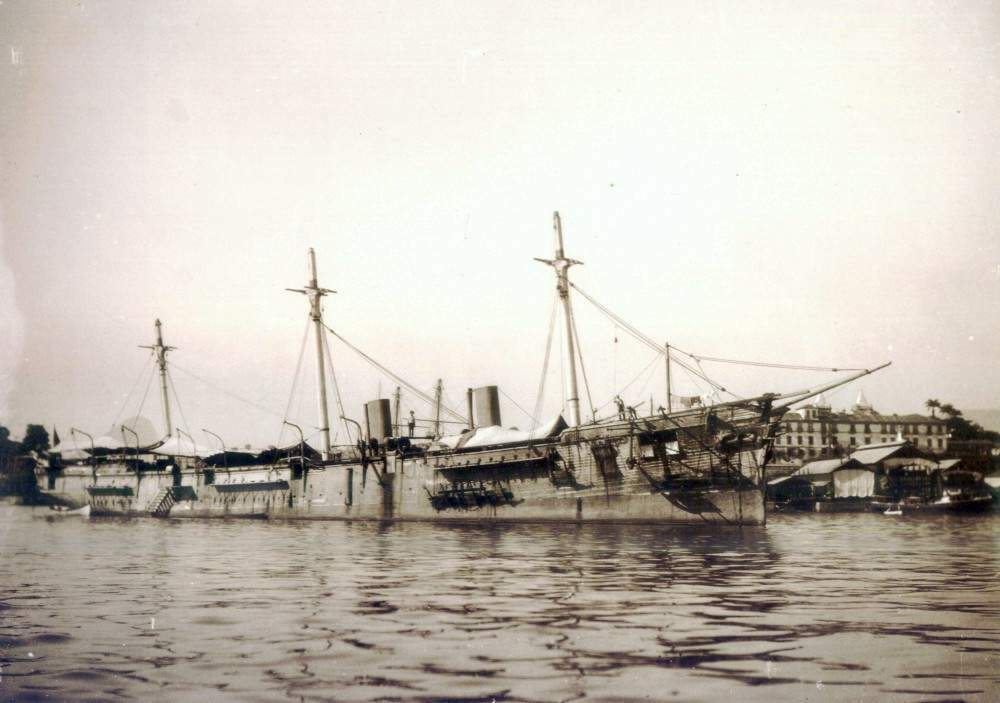
- Trajano in Guanabara Bay

History

Empire of Brazil
- Name: Trajano
- Namesake: Trajano Augusto de Carvalho
- Builder: Arsenal de Marinha da Corte
- Laid down: 27 May 1872
- Launched: 12 July 1873
- Commissioned: 17 July 1873
- Decommissioned: 11 April 1906

General characteristics
- Type: Cruiser
- Displacement: 1,392 tonnes (1,370 long tons)
- Length: 200 ft (61 m)
- Beam: 31 ft (9.4 m)
- Height: 19.5 ft (5.9 m)
- Draft: 15 ft 4 in (4.67 m)
- Installed power: 2,400 ihp (1,800 kW)
- Propulsion: Mixed steam-sail; John Penn and Sons steam engines
- Speed: 12 knots (22 km/h; 14 mph)
- Armament: 3 × 70-pounder Whitworth guns

Trajano (also briefly called Toneleiros) was a cruiser-type warship belonging to the Imperial Brazilian Navy from 1873 to 1889 and later to the Brazilian Navy from 1889 to 1906.

== Construction and design ==
Trajano was built at the Arsenal de Marinha da Corte in Rio de Janeiro between 1872 and 1873. Its name was given by request of emperor Pedro II as a tribute to naval engineer Trajano Augusto de Carvalho, who was the ship's designer. It was laid down on 27 May 1872, with the presence of the emperor. It was launched on 12 July 1873, also with the presence of the emperor, the officership and about a thousand spectators, being incorporated into the navy a few days later on 17 July 1873.

The ship was built of wood and steel, displacing a total of 1392 tonnes. It measured 200 ft in length, 31 ft of beam, 15 ft of draft and 19.5 ft in height. It was powered by John Penn and Sons steam engines and sails, which produced a total of 2400 HP propelling the ship to a maximum speed of 12 knots. Trajano was armed with three 70-pounder Whitworth guns and other smaller guns of unspecified caliber.

== Service ==
With the outbreak of the Navy Revolt, promoted by units of the Brazilian Navy against the government of the newly proclaimed Brazilian Republic after the 1889 Coup, Trajano was seized by the rebels, taking part in the revolt in 1893 and bombing fortified positions in Rio de Janeiro. In this period, it was temporarily renamed to Toneleiros. The ship was decommissioned in 1906 by Notice No. 499 of April 11.

== See also ==
- List of historical ships of the Brazilian Navy
