= Brazilian battleship Riachuelo =

Ironclad battleship (1883–1910)

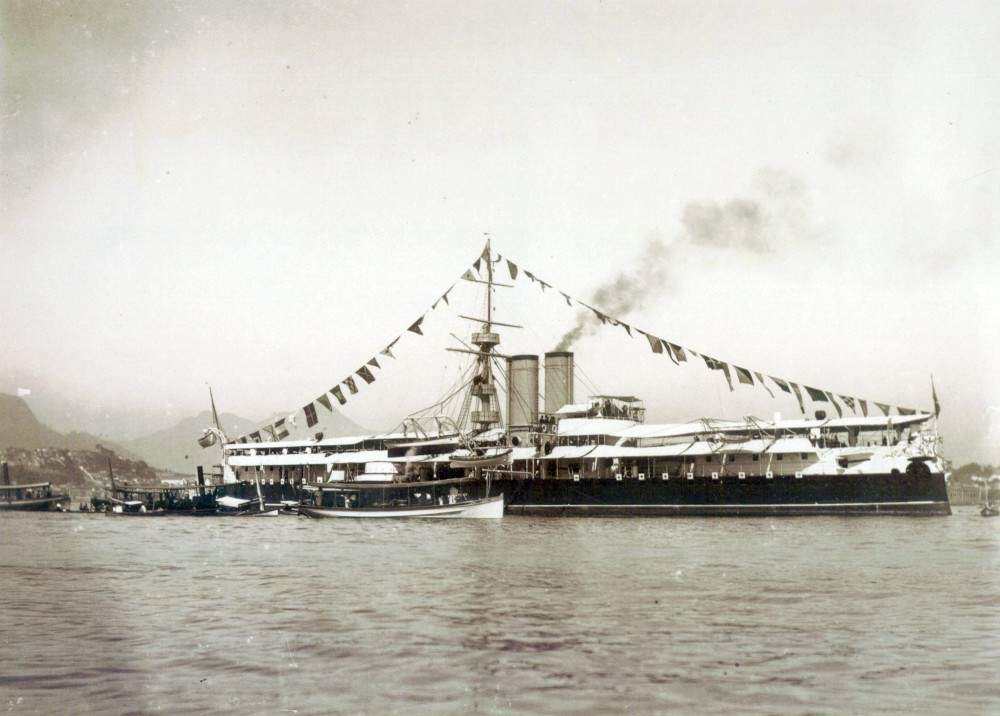
- The ironclad Riachuelo, 1885.

History

Brazil
- Name: Riachuelo
- Namesake: Battle of Riachuelo
- Builder: Samuda Brothers, London, UK
- Laid down: 31 August 1881
- Launched: 7 June 1883
- Commissioned: 19 November 1883
- Decommissioned: 1910
- Fate: Scrapped 1914

General characteristics
- Type: Ironclad battleship
- Displacement: 5,029 tons
- Length: 93.33 m (306.2 ft)
- Beam: 17.16 m (56.3 ft)
- Draft: 5.60 m (18.4 ft)
- Installed power: 4,500 hp (3,400 kW)
- Speed: 16 kn (30 km/h; 18 mph)
- Range: 6,000 nmi (11,000 km) at 10 kn (19 km/h)
- Complement: 367
- Armament: As built: Main: 4 × 9.2-inch (234 mm) guns in two turrets; Secondary: 6 × 5.5-inch (140 mm) guns, 15 × 1-pounder (37 mm) guns, 5 × 14-inch (356 mm) torpedo tubes; After 1894 refit: Main: 4 × 240 mm (9.45 in) guns in two turrets; Secondary: 6 × 120 mm (4.7 in) guns, 6 × 47mm (1.85 in) guns, 5 × 356 mm (14 in) torpedo tubes

Riachuelo (Portuguese: [ʁiaˈʃuelu]) was a Brazilian ironclad battleship completed in 1883. She was named in honour of the Battle of Riachuelo in 1865. Built in the United Kingdom, the ship entered service with the Brazilian Navy in 1883 and remained in service until 1910.

== Design ==
Profile and plan drawing of Riachuelo

Riachuelo was built after the Brazilian Minister of the Navy, Admiral José Rodrigues de Lima Duarte, presented a report to the national legislature on the importance of modernising the Brazilian Navy by acquiring new battleships, with the intention to order two from British shipyards. Riachuelo was constructed by Samuda Brothers in London, being laid down on 31 August 1881, launched on 7 June 1883 and commissioned into the Brazilian Navy on 19 November 1883. The slightly smaller Aquidabã was launched in 1885.

Riachuelo was constructed with a steel hull, and was the first battleship with a compound armour belt, following shortly after the Argentine armoured corvette ARA Almirante Brown. Both Riachuelo and Aquidabã had an unusual design that became popular in the 1870s and 1880s: the two main gun turrets were placed off the centreline, en echelon, with the forward turret offset to port and the aft turret to starboard. The superstructure ran the full length of the vessel, higher than both turrets, with two funnels and three fully rigged masts. Aquidabã can be distinguished by its single funnel.

These two modern battleships made the Brazilian Navy the strongest in the western hemisphere. Hilary A. Herbert, the chairman of the House Naval Affairs Committee in order to push the U.S. to increase its naval spending and build its first battleships warned Congress in 1883: “if all this old navy of ours were drawn up in battle array in mid-ocean and confronted by the Riachuelo it is doubtful whether a single vessel bearing the American flag would get into port”. A similar design was followed by USS Maine and USS Texas, launched in 1889 and 1892 respectively. By the time they were completed in 1895, developments in battleship design had made them obsolete.

== In service ==
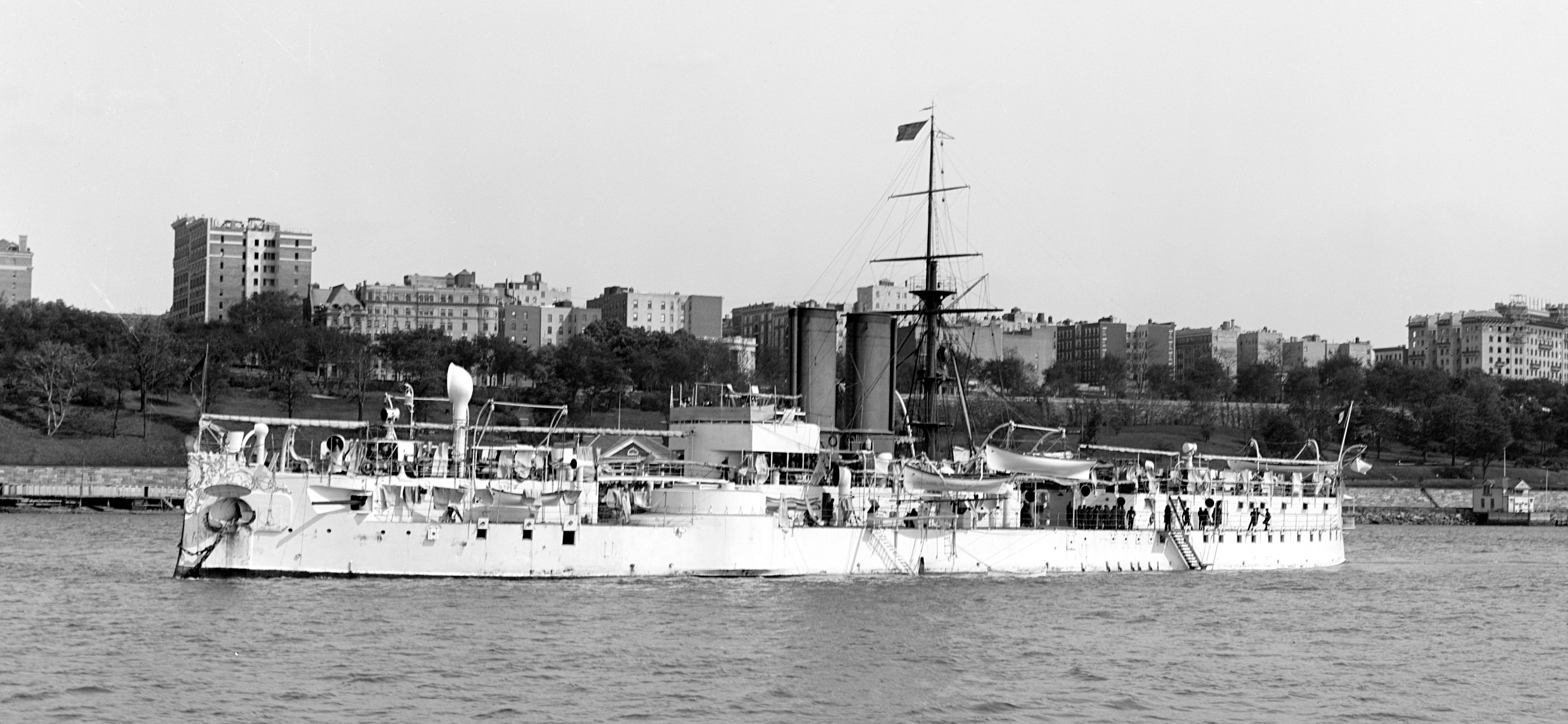
Battleship Riachuelo circa 1907

When the Republic of Brazil was declared in 1889, Riachuelo escorted the Brazilian Imperial Family to exile in Europe. Riachuelo and Aquidabã, the two most powerful vessels in the Brazilian Navy, were both in dock for repairs in 1891 during the first Revolta da Armada (mutiny of the Brazilian Navy), led by Custódio José de Melo, which eventually forced the dictatorial President, Marshal Deodoro da Fonseca, to resign in favour of Marshal Floriano Peixoto.

Riachuelo was modernised and rearmed in Toulon in 1893–94, where structural alterations included the replacement of the three rigged masts with two unrigged fighting masts. Riachuelo returned to active service in 1896, and led the so-called "White Squadron" of President Campos Sales on his official visit to Argentina in 1900, accompanied by the cruisers Almirante Barroso and Tamoio. Its last important mission in 1907 was to convey the Brazilian Naval Commission to take delivery of the new battleships, Minas Geraes and São Paulo.

Riachuelo was deactivated in 1910 and put under tow to be broken up in Europe. She arrived at Bo'ness, Scotland on 14 May 1914 to be broken up by the Forth Shipbreaking Co. (Linlithgowshire Gazette, 15 May 1914).

== See also ==
- USS Texas (1892)
- List of historical ships of the Brazilian Navy
