= Francisco Manuel Barroso, Baron of Amazonas =

Brazilian admiral (1804–1882)

Baron of Amazonas
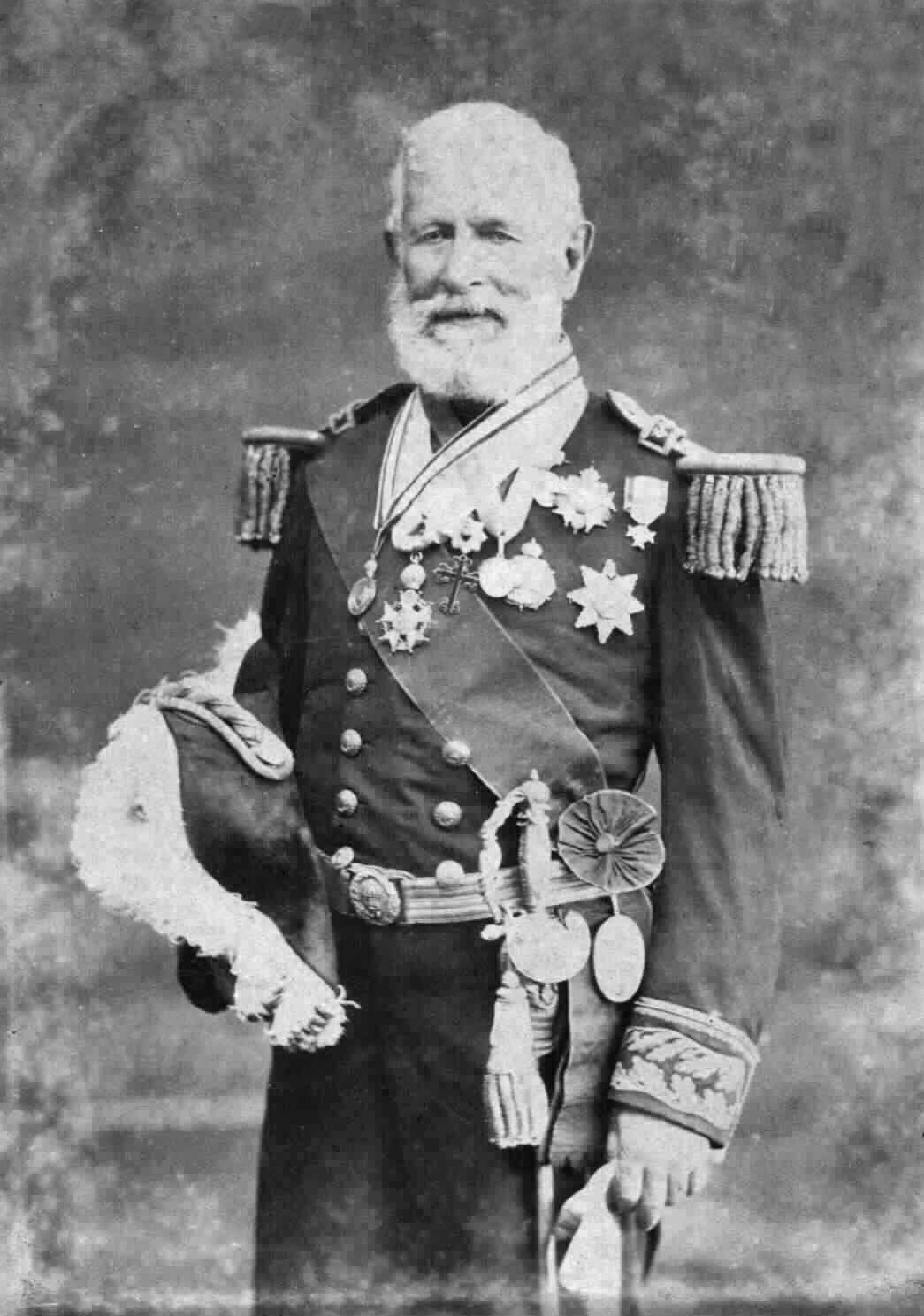
- The Baron of Amazonas, c. 1875
- Born: 29 September 1804; Lisbon, Kingdom of Portugal
- Died: 8 August 1882 (aged 77); Montevideo, Uruguay
- Military career
- Allegiance: Empire of Brazil
- Branch: Imperial Brazilian Navy
- Rank: Admiral
- Conflicts: Brazilian War of Independence; Cisplatine War; Ragamuffin War; Uruguayan War; Paraguayan War
- Awards: Imperial Order of the Southern Cross

Francisco Manuel Barroso da Silva, Baron of Amazonas (29 September 1804 – 8 August 1882) was a Portuguese-born Brazilian admiral. He was the commander who led the Imperial Navy to victory in the Battle of Riachuelo during the Paraguayan War.

As a consequence of this victory, there was an expressive reduction in the Paraguayan naval capacity, and that nation, from then on, had to adopt defensive strategies until the end of the conflict.

Barroso was decorated with the Imperial Order of the Southern Cross and received the noble title of Baron of Amazonas in 1866, in honor of the flagship ship Amazonas that he commanded in the Battle of Riachuelo.

== See also ==
- Monument to Admiral Barroso
