= Placido Moreira Dias =

Brazilian military commander

Captain Plácido Moreira Dias
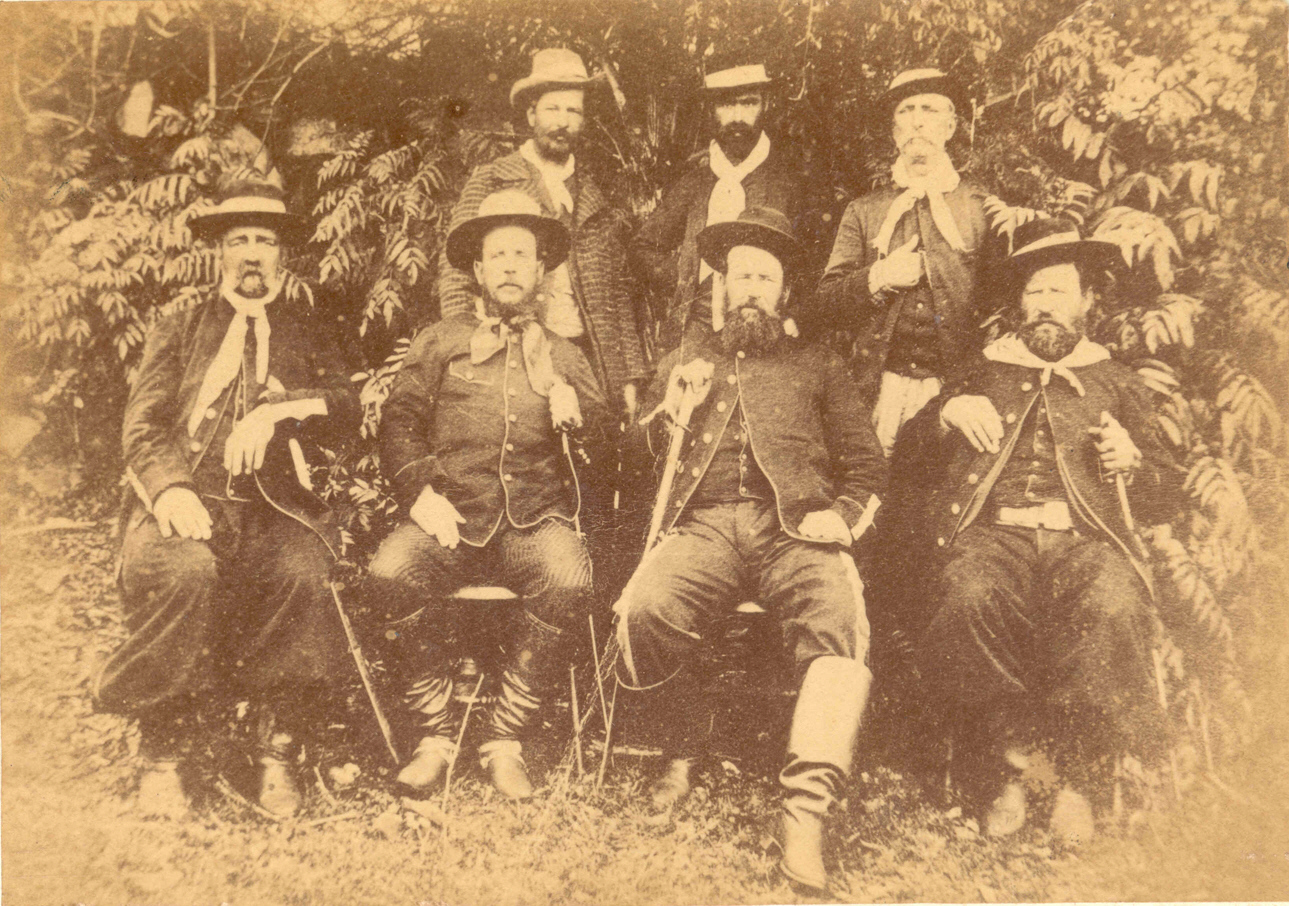
- Plácido alongside Gumercindo Saraiva and the Maragarato commanders.
- Born: May 26, 1853; Alegrete, Rio Grande do Sul, Brazil
- Died: Rio Grande do Sul, Brazil
- Spouse: Antonia Maria Lemes Gonçalves
- Children: Januário Moreira Dias; Abelino Moreira Dias
- Military career
- Allegiance: Brazil
- Rank: Captain
- Known for: Founder of the Liberator Party
- Conflicts: Federalist Revolution

Placido Moreira Dias (May 26, 1853 – unknown) was a Brazilian military commander who fought in the Federalist Revolution as captain maragato and one of the founders of the Liberator Party.

== Early life ==
Plácido grew up in a time of great transformation in Brazil, marked by disputes between centralists and federalists. In 1893, he took an active part in the Federalist Revolution, a civil conflict that shook the Southern Region of the country between 1893 and 1895. As a Maragato, he proudly wore the red scarf, a symbol of resistance against the government of Júlio de Castilhos.

The Liberal Party was founded in 1928 by politicians from the old Federalist Party of Rio Grande do Sul, especially Joaquim Francisco de Assis Brasil and Raul Pilla. However, Plácido Moreira Dias also played a key role in the founding of the party, which advocated for a parliamentary system of government and federalism.

He married Mrs. Antonia Maria Lemes Gonçalves (1865–?) in 1885 in Quaraí, and they had at least two children: Januário and Abelino Moreira Dias.
