= Battle of Passo Fundo =

Battle

- Part of the Federalist Revolution
Date	27 June 1894
Location	Passo Fundo, Brazil 28°16′20″S 52°33′3″W
Result	Government victory

Belligerents
Brazil	Federalist rebels Supported by: Uruguayan volunteers

Commanders and leaders
Pinheiro Machado	Gumercindo Saraiva

Strength
4,000	3,200

Casualties and losses
237: 60–240 killed 177 wounded	250: 100–400 killed 150 wounded 300 captured

The Battle of Passo Fundo or the Battle of the Pulador was a military engagement fought between forces of the First Brazilian Republic and various military units affiliated with the Federalist Revolution. The battle, which was fought on 27 June 1894 along the Passo Fundo River (in the state of Rio Grande do Sul), was the largest battle of the Federalist Revolution. It ended in a victory for the Brazilian Republic.
