= Manuel do Nascimento Vargas =

Brazilian military officer and politician (1844–1943)

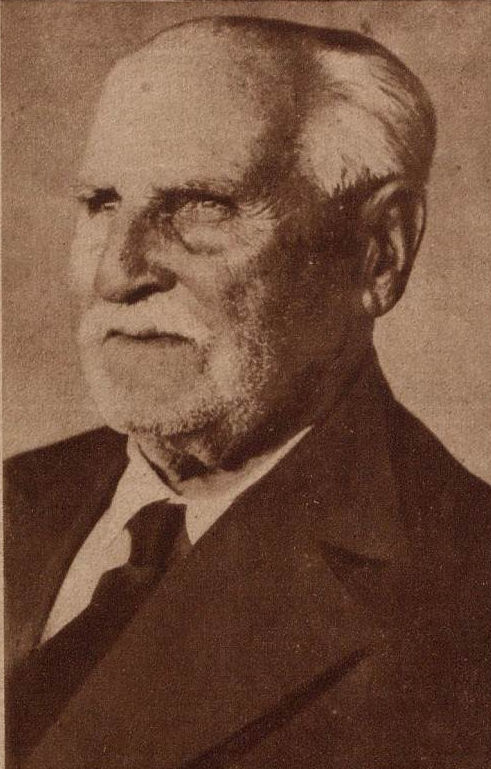
- Vargas in 1934, one day before his 90th birthday

Mayor of São Borja
- In office 1907–1911
- Preceded by: Aparicio Mariense da Silva
- Succeeded by: Antônio Ferreira Sarmanho

Personal details
- Born: 25 November 1844 Passo Fundo, Riograndense Republic
- Died: 21 October 1943 (aged 98) Rio de Janeiro, Brazil
- Party: Rio-grandense Republican Party
- Spouse: Cândida Dornelles (m. 1872)
- Children: 5, including Getúlio
- Nickname: Hero of the Paraguayan War

Military service
- Allegiance: Empire of Brazil; First Brazilian Republic
- Branch/service: Army
- Rank: Brigade general
- Battles/wars: Paraguayan War; Federalist Revolution

Manuel do Nascimento Vargas (25 November 1844 – 21 October 1943) was a Brazilian military officer and politician who is best known as the father of President Getúlio Vargas. He served as mayor of São Borja from 1907 to 1911.

== Biography ==
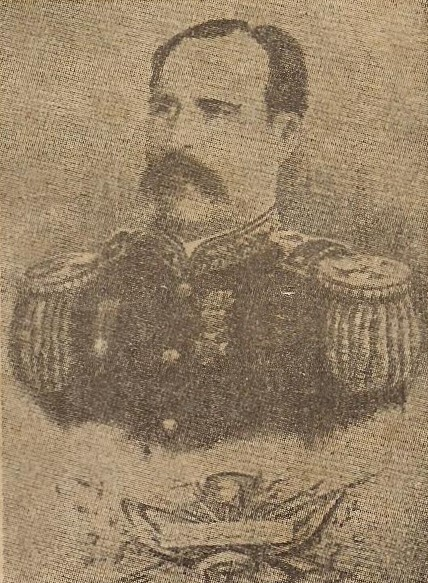
Portrait of Vargas in military uniform, late 19th century

Vargas was born on 25 November 1844 in Passo Fundo in the province of Rio Grande do Sul, in the Empire of Brazil. He was one of fourteen children born to Luísa Maria Teresa Vargas, from Rio Pardo, and Evaristo José Vargas, from Encruzilhada. His father fought in the Ragamuffin War as a volunteer soldier of the Riograndense Republic.

He enlisted in the Imperial Army as a corporal during the Paraguayan War. Having served with distinction, by the end of the conflict Vargas had reached the rank of colonel and gained recognition as a war hero. After the war he left the army and settled as a rancher (estancieiro) in São Borja, in the Argentine border, and in 1872 married Cândida Dornelles, member of a powerful local family. They had five children: Viriato, Protásio, Getúlio, Espártaco and Benjamim. By 1884, Vargas was the leader of the republican political club of São Borja and the city's leading abolitionist.

On the proclamation of the Republic in 1889, Vargas became the head of the Rio-grandense Republican Party (Partido Republicano Riograndense) in São Borja. A few years later, in 1893, the Federalist Revolution broke out in Rio Grande do Sul, an attempt by federalist rebels (known as "maragatos") to overthrow the state governor, Júlio de Castilhos. As a partisan of Castilhos, Vargas rejoined the army in order to take part in the suppression of the revolt. He was wounded in battle in his hometown Passo Fundo in July 1894. During the war he was promoted to colonel by President Floriano Peixoto, and finally to brigade general by Floriano's successor Prudente de Moraes.

With the government's victory over the federalists in 1895, Vargas achieved both military and political prominence. In 1907 he was appointed municipal intendant (equivalent to modern mayor) of São Borja by state governor Borges de Medeiros, an office he held until 1911.

Vargas died on 21 October 1943 at Guanabara Palace, his son Getúlio's official residence as president of Brazil, in Rio de Janeiro. His cause of death was attributed to bronchopneumonia. At the time of his death, little over a month before turning 99, Vargas suffered from blindness but remained lucid. He was buried next to his wife Cândida in São Borja.
