= Castilhism =

Brazilian political current

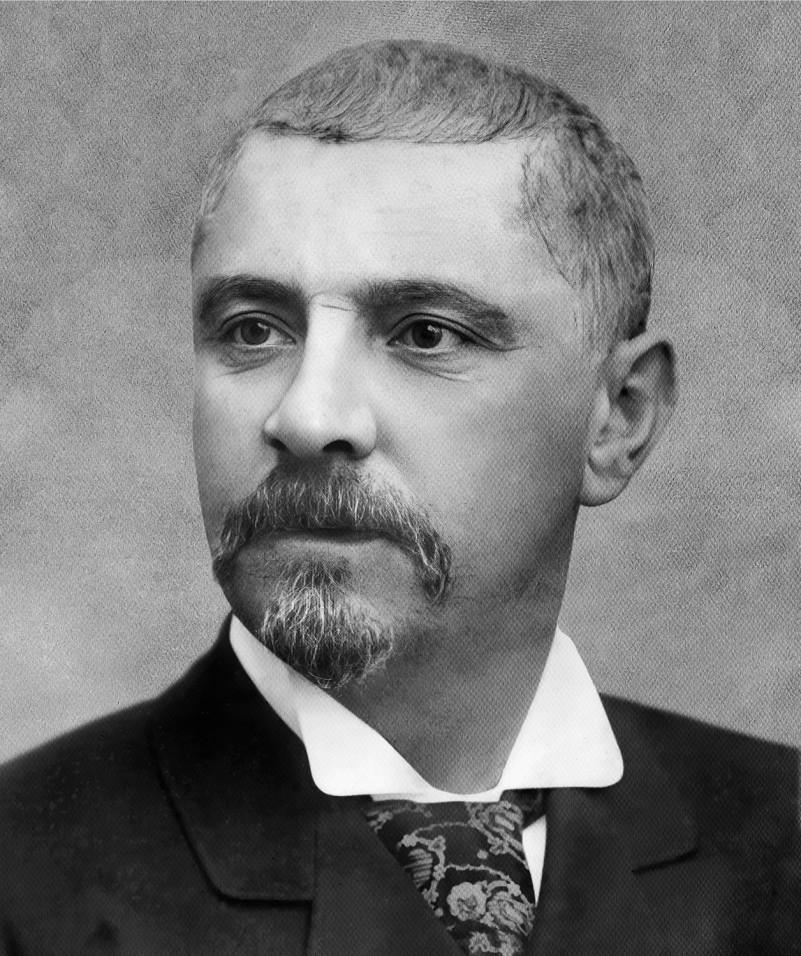
Júlio de Castilhos, creator and main theoretician of Castilhism

Castilhism was the political current established by Júlio de Castilhos with the creation of the Rio Grande do Sul Constitution of 1891. It was the guiding principle of the Estado Novo, Getúlio Vargas' dictatorial period. It is the ideology behind the Brazilian labour movement, which elevated Castilhism to national importance.

Castilhism's characteristics were: the centralization of powers in the Executive, the implementation of mechanisms for direct participation, such as plebiscites, the establishment of a modernizing, interventionist and regulating state in the economy, as well as its intermediary and moralizing role in society.

According to Rodriguez, "while for liberal philosophy the public good resulted from preserving the interests of individuals, which basically included private property and freedom of exchange, as well as the so-called civil liberties, for Castilhos the public good surpassed the limits of the material interests of individuals to become impersonal and spiritual. The public good is achieved in a society that is formalized by a strong state that imposes individual disinterest for the benefit of the well-being of the community". At this moment, self-interest is pure and simple immorality.

== Context ==
Castilhism emerged as an ideology in 1882 after the foundation of the newspaper A Federação, created by Venâncio Aires, Júlio de Castilhos and Pinheiro Machado, a group that would later be responsible for establishing the Rio-grandense Republican Party (PRR in Portuguese), together with Getúlio Vargas' father, Manuel do Nascimento Vargas. It was a conservative political movement, but committed to economic modernization as it had its supporters in the industrial and urban bourgeoisie. It was also influenced by Auguste Comte's positivism.

In 1891, Júlio de Castilhos was elected president of Rio Grande do Sul and instituted the state's constitution, drafted by him and approved almost unchanged. The behavior would be institutionalized by Borges de Medeiros, who introduced the concept of successive re-elections until he led the state into civil war in the early 1920s, demanding the intervention of the federal government and the reform of the 1926 Constitution.

== Principles ==
Castilhism had three basic principles:

1. Rulers should be chosen based on their moral purity and not on their popular representativeness;
2. In politics, party political disputes should be eliminated and only virtue should be valued;
3. The ruler should regenerate society, and the state should lead the transformation and modernization of society.

For Castilhos, the public good is based on the complete political and administrative reorganization of the state, according to the principle of "conserving by improving". It is also based on the material prosperity of the state (public works, industrial development, stability of government credit, repayment of public debt, state savings). The official powers must provide society with useful services based on the contributions made by citizens.

Castilhos wanted to promote the belief that the political-constitutional organization he was developing for Rio Grande do Sul would establish a "regime of virtue", in which the people capable of governing would not necessarily be those elected to the position, but those who demonstrated their "purity of intent" and personal disinterest in favour of the public good. The public asset would only be achieved by a virtuous leader who, by leading a strong state, would establish the complete political and administrative reorganization of the state, material prosperity and a moralizing civic education. Articulating his moral capacity with the ethical interest of a public good, Castilhos presented the figure of the President as an enlightened and moralizing entity, who placed the interests of the state above individual priorities. Moral and intellectual progress would be achieved through a dictatorial order and state intervention. According to José Murilo de Carvalho, "this was an ideal of illustrated despotism that had long roots in the Brazilian Portuguese tradition since the Pombaline times of the 18th century".

Combined with a notion of the public good, Castilhos established the first fundament of his authority, which would become absolute when it was translated into law. Rather than being chosen by election, the virtue enabled him to govern in a supreme manner, as stated in Article 7 of the Constitution: "The supreme governmental and administrative direction of the State rests with the President, who shall exercise it freely, according to the public good, interpreted in accordance with the laws".

While in liberal philosophy the public good was reached by conciliating individual interests, for Castilhos it could only be accomplished by achieving the essential core of the ideal society, which he understood in terms of the "reign of virtue". For him, the public good involved an enlightened ruler who strengthened the state to the detriment of selfish individual interests and who ensured the civic education of citizens, the origin of all social morality. In 1891, the newspaper A Federação introduced its 146th issue with the following text:

We have already said it and we will never stop repeating it: the full regularization of public and private life is only possible with a complete regeneration of customs, through a new education, embracing all aspects of human life. Only this fundamental process will bring about the social harmony we all desire. For this to happen, there needs to be an independent power, which instructs and governs consciences, convincing; for this to happen, a more intense moral culture needs to allow the intervention of the power that appeals and invites kindly, that modifies our conduct, that leads us to do well, mobilizing our good feelings in favor of what it wants to avenge.

== Development ==
In 1893, the Federalist Revolution, a Brazilian civil war between the liberals of Rio Grande do Sul and the Castilhos government, took place. The conflict reached the states of Santa Catarina and Paraná and, in the end, the liberals were defeated. Silveira Martins, the leader of the opposition, was disliked by both Deodoro (who had been governor of Rio Grande during the Empire) and the Republicans. The victory of Castilhos' pica-paus over Silveira Martins' maragatos gave a strong incentive to Castilhism, which remained the hegemonic force in Rio Grande do Sul uninterruptedly between 1893 and 1937.

Originally with a limited reach, the castilhistas expanded their influence to a national level, projecting names such as Pinheiro Machado, Borges de Medeiros, Flores da Cunha, Lindolfo Collor, Góis Monteiro, Oswaldo Aranha and Getúlio Vargas. Castilhism reached its peak in 1930, when the Revolution propelled Vargas to the presidency of Brazil, supported by tenentistas and modernists. The Estado Novo, his dictatorial regime, was essentially a national replication of Castilhism.

== See also ==
- Federalist Revolution
- Vargas Era
