= Serro =

Coordinates: 18.605°S 43.379°W

- Municipality
- Municipality of Serro
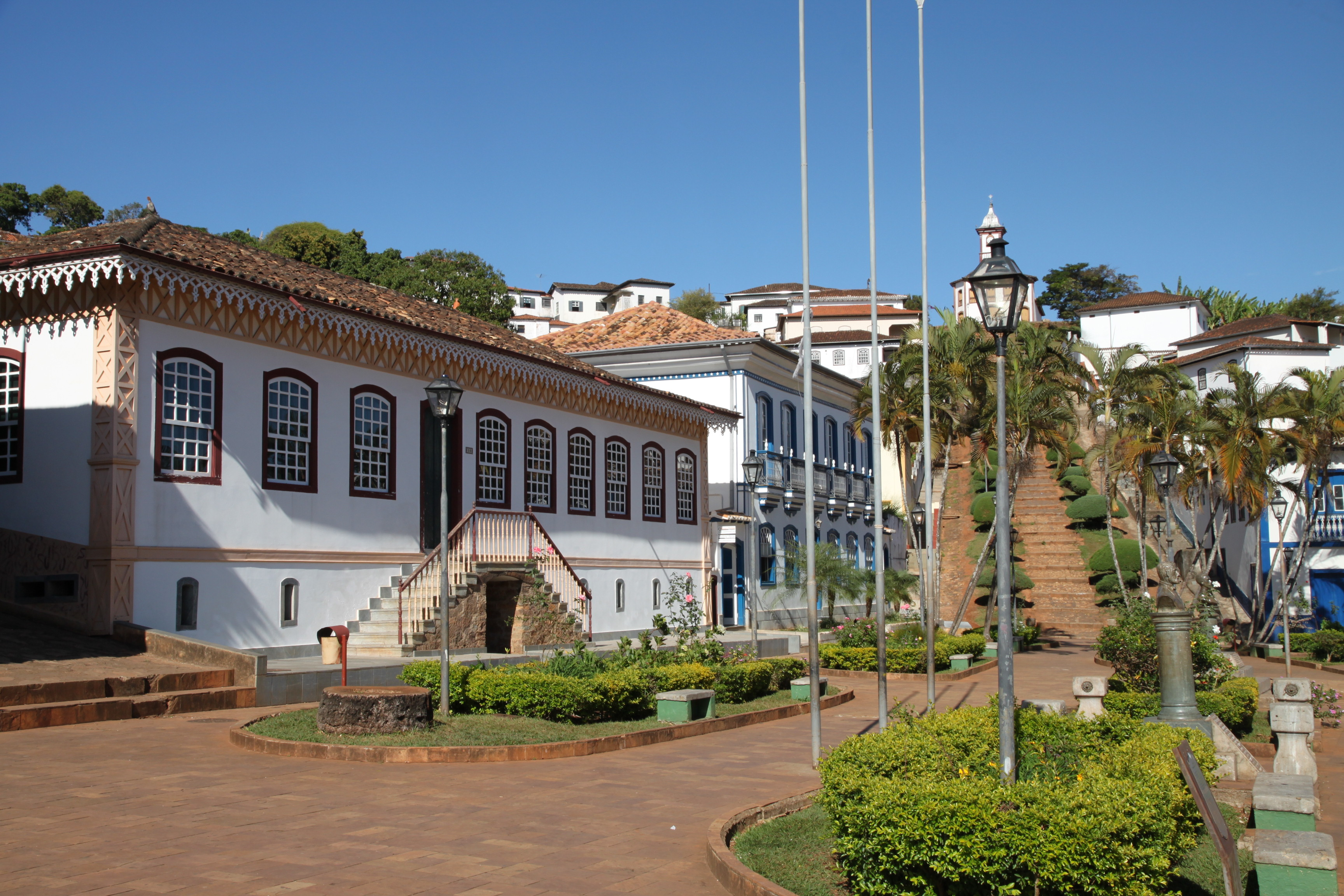
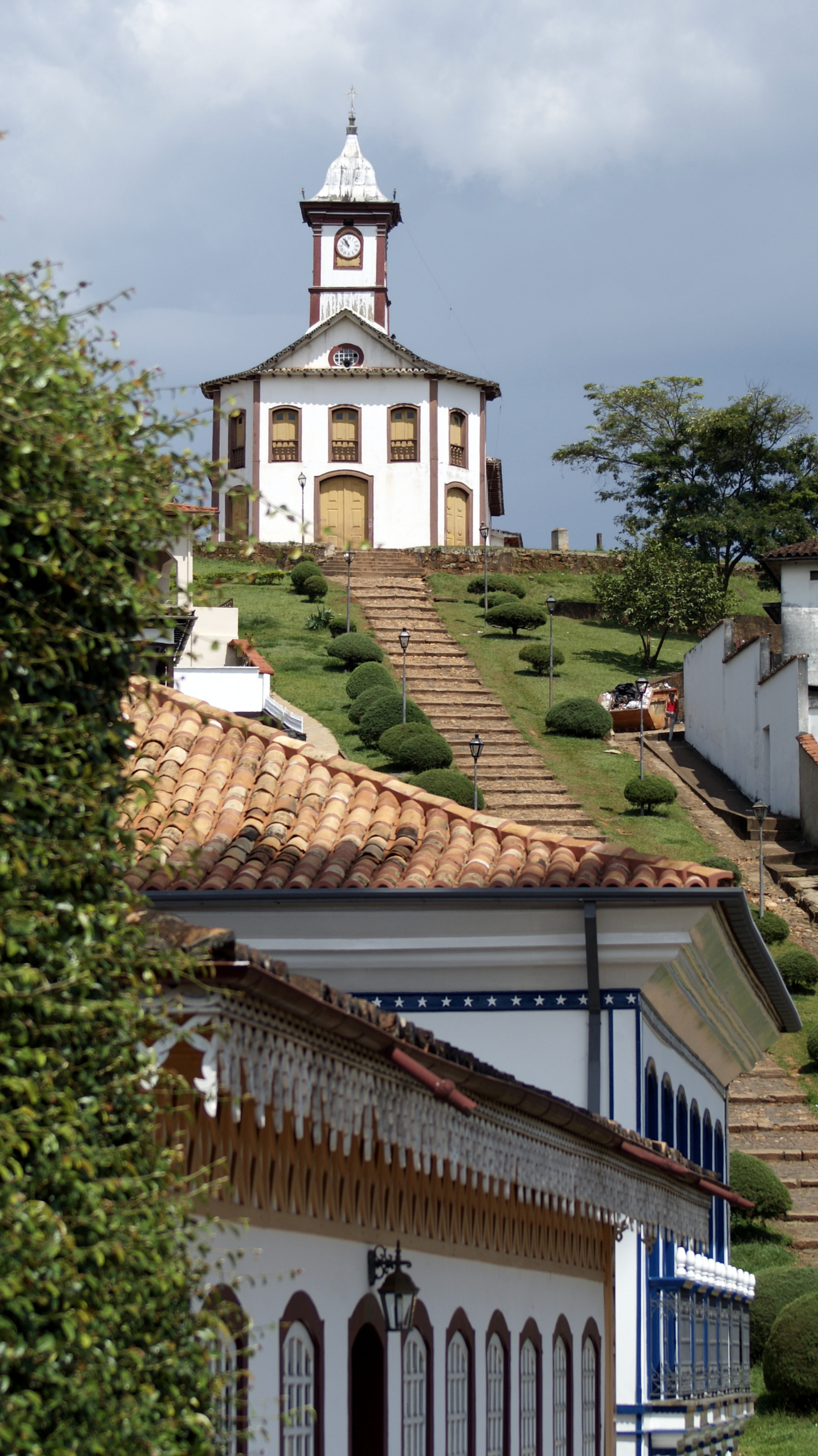
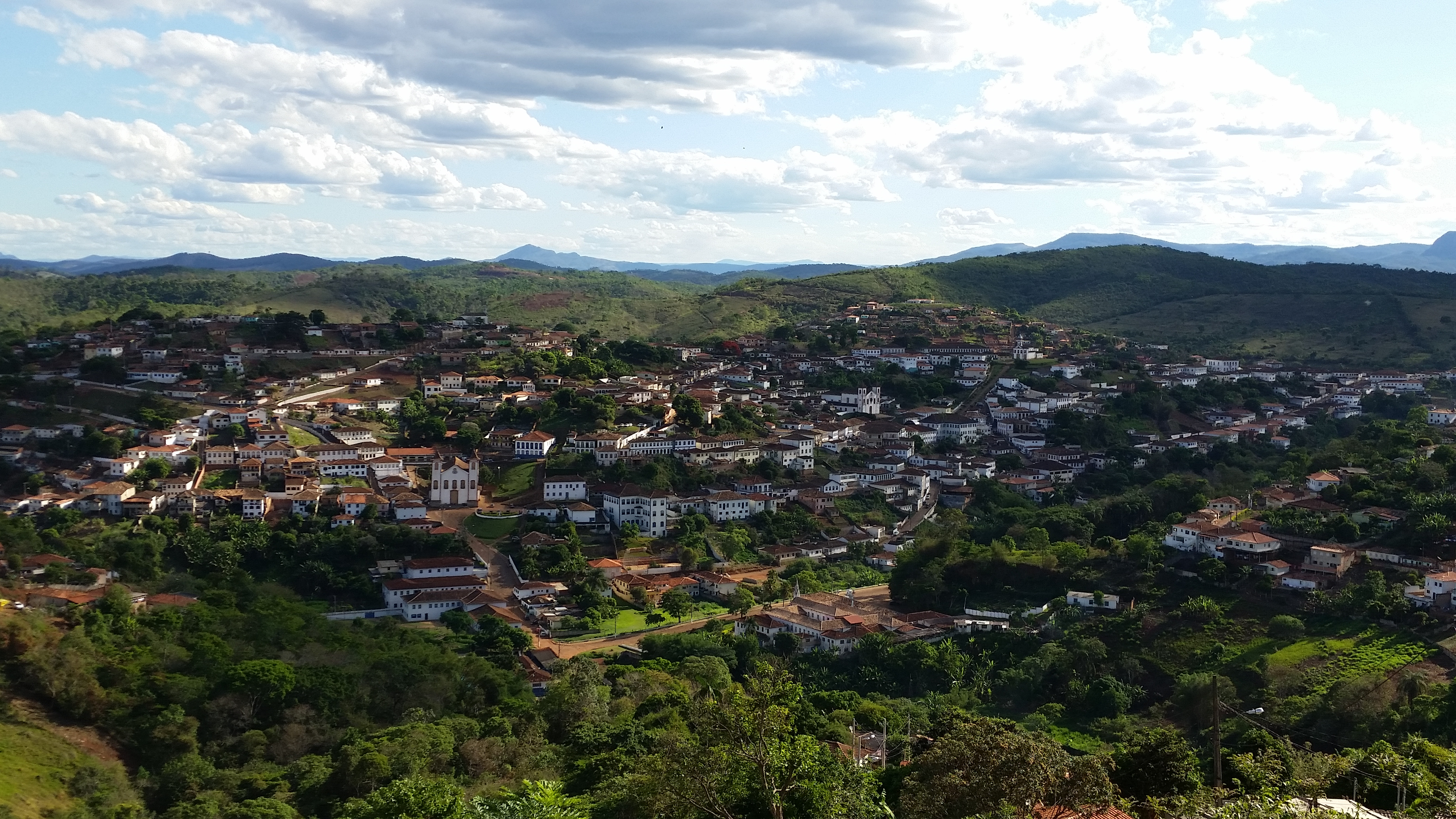
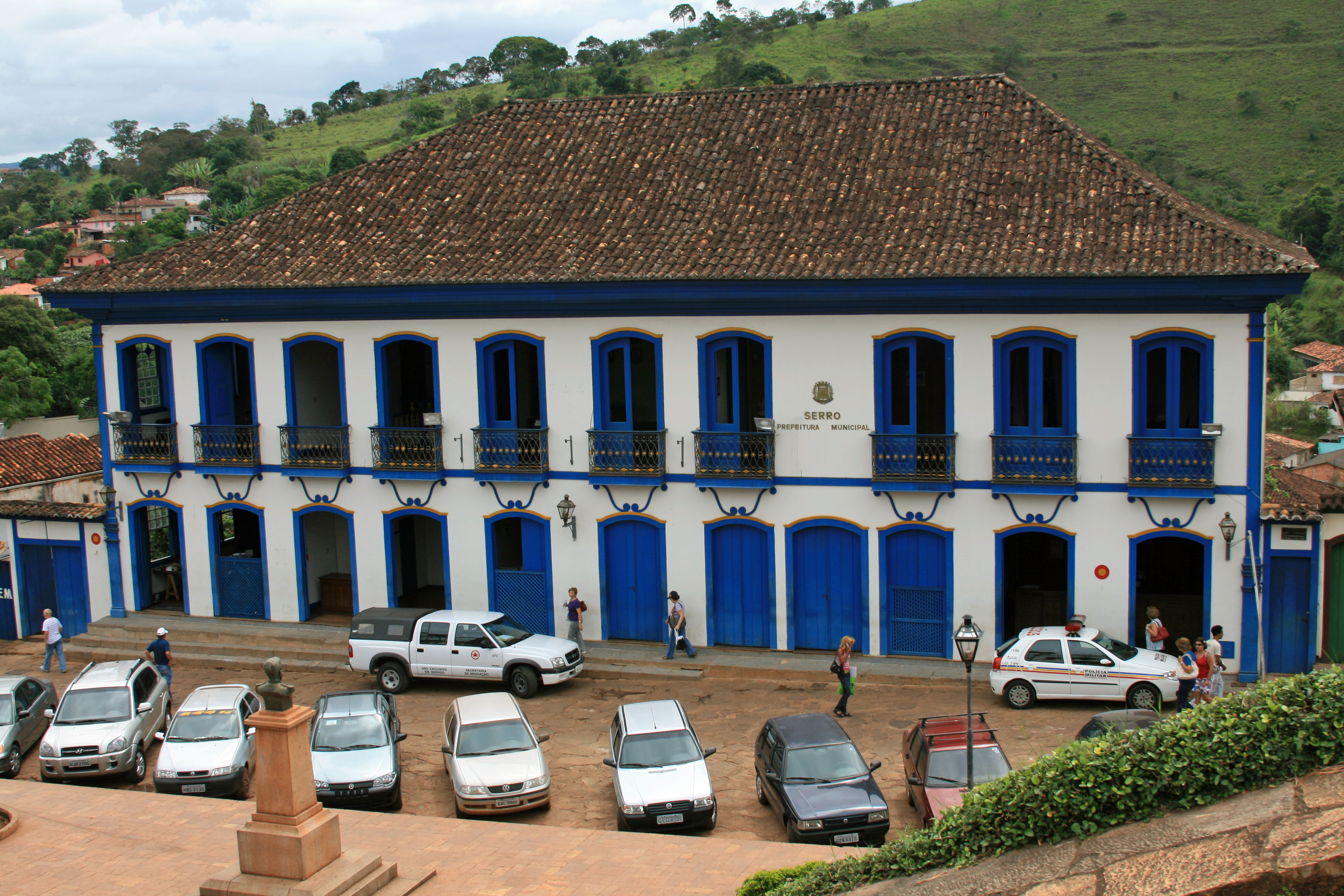
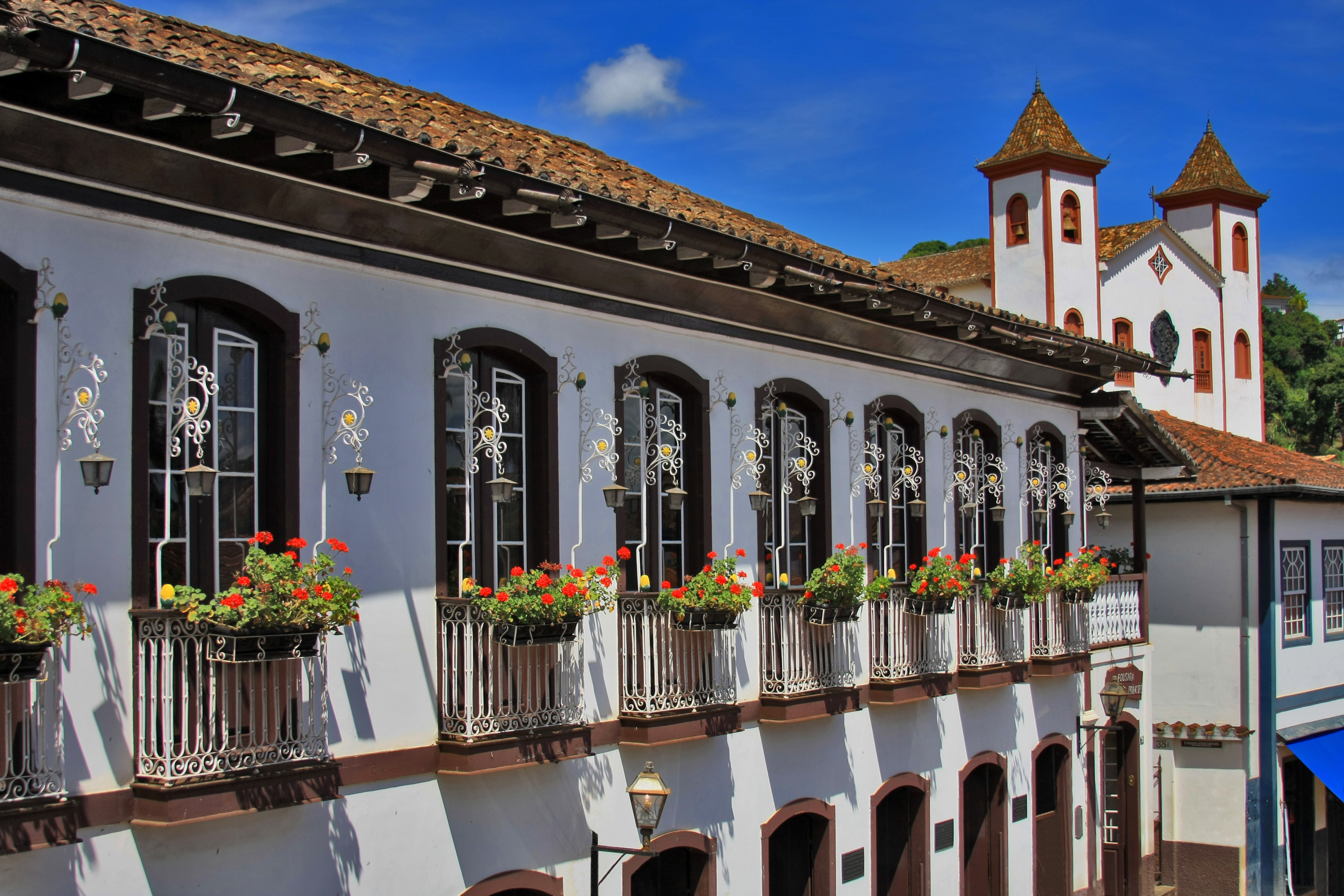
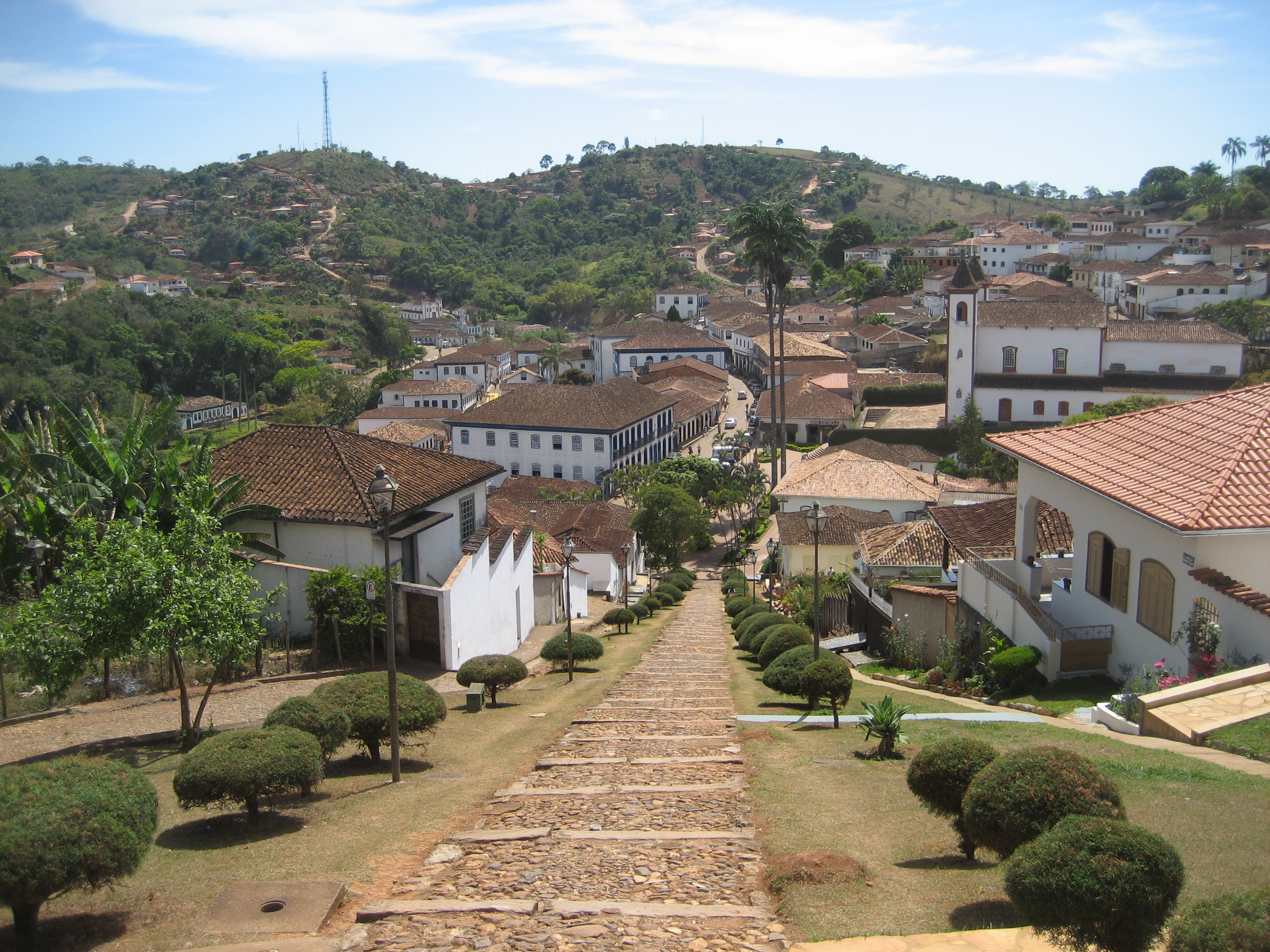

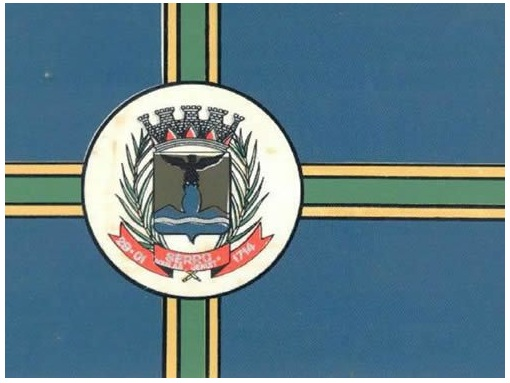
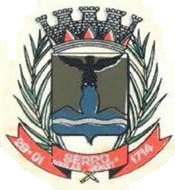
- Flag Coat of arms

- Location in Minas Gerais
- Country: Brazil
- Region: Southeast
- State: Minas Gerais
- Founded: 6 March 1838

Government
  - Mayor: Epaminondas Pires de Miranda (PL)

Area
  - Total: 1,217.813 km^{2} (470.200 sq mi)
- Elevation: 835 m (2,740 ft)

Population (2021)
  - Total: 20,915
  - Density: 17.11/km^{2} (44.3/sq mi)
- Demonym: serrano
- Time zone: UTC−3 (BRT)
- Postal Code: 39150-000 to 39159-999
- HDI (2010): 0.656 – medium
- Website: www.serro.mg.gov.br

Serro is a Brazilian municipality located in the state of Minas Gerais. The city belongs to the metropolitan area of Belo Horizonte and to the microregion of Conceição do Mato Dentro. As of 2020, the estimated population was 20,940.

In colonial times the city was known by the name Vila do Príncipe (English: Prince Town). In this city were born Emerico Lobo de Mesquita, one of the most prominent composers of the Classicism movement in Brazil, and Gomes Carneiro, a general who fought on the Paraguayan War and on the Federalist Revolution.

Serro is well known for its traditional cheese, cultural richness, colonial influence and unique environment.

The municipality contains part of the 4,696-hectare (11,600-acre) Pico do Itambé State Park, created in 1998.

== See also ==
- List of municipalities in Minas Gerais
