= Siege of Lapa =

Bloody war for presidential reform

- Part of the Federalist Revolution
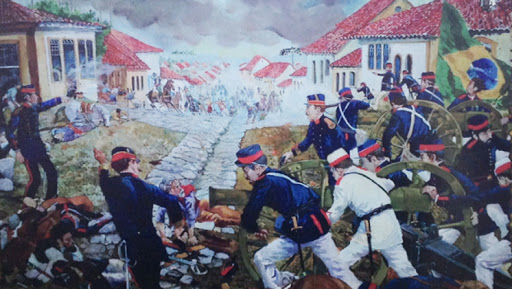
Date	14 January – 11 February 1894 (4 weeks)
Location	Lapa, Paraná, Brazil 25°46′7″S 49°42′59″W
Result	Federalist victory

Belligerents
Federalists	Brazil

Commanders and leaders
Gumercindo Saraiva	(Brazil) Gomes Carneiro †

Strength
~3,000	700–900; 6 cannons 2 Nordenfelt guns

The siege of Lapa was a military confrontation involving the Brazilian Army, the National Guard, the Military Police of Paraná state and civilian volunteers, which took place during the Federalist Revolution in early 1894. The city of Lapa became the arena of a bloody confrontation between the loyalist republican troops, commonly called pica-paus (woodpeckers) against the maragatos, federalist rebels, who opposed the presidential form of government. The loyalists resisted the siege for 26 days, but succumbed due to the lack of ammunition and food.

The siege gave president Floriano Peixoto enough time to gather and equip soldiers in São Paulo to fight back the federalist advance. The besieged forces numbered between 700 and 900 regulars and volunteer civilians, mostly were volunteers however, fighting against the revolutionary forces which consisted of about three thousand combatants. The remains of general Carneiro, as well as many others who fell during the resistance, are buried in the town's Pantheon of Heroes.

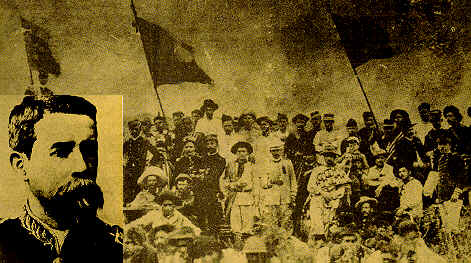
Colonel Gomes Carneiro and the "martyrs" of Lapa.

== Bibliography ==
- Priori, Angelo; Pomari, Luciana Regina; Amâncio, Silvia Maria; Ipólito, Veronica Karina (2012). "A Revolução Federalista e o cerca da Lapa" (PDF). História do Paraná: séculos XIX e XX (in Portuguese). SciELO Books - EDUEM. ISBN 978-85-7628-587-8. OCLC 1096584888.
- de Souza, Gabriel Lechinhoski Camilo (2019). "Lições aprendidas quanto ao princípio da guerra segurança pelo exército brasileiro no cerco da Lapa" (PDF) (in Portuguese). Resende: Academia Militar das Agulhas Negras.
