= Pinheiro Machado (politician) =

Brazilian politician (1851–1915)

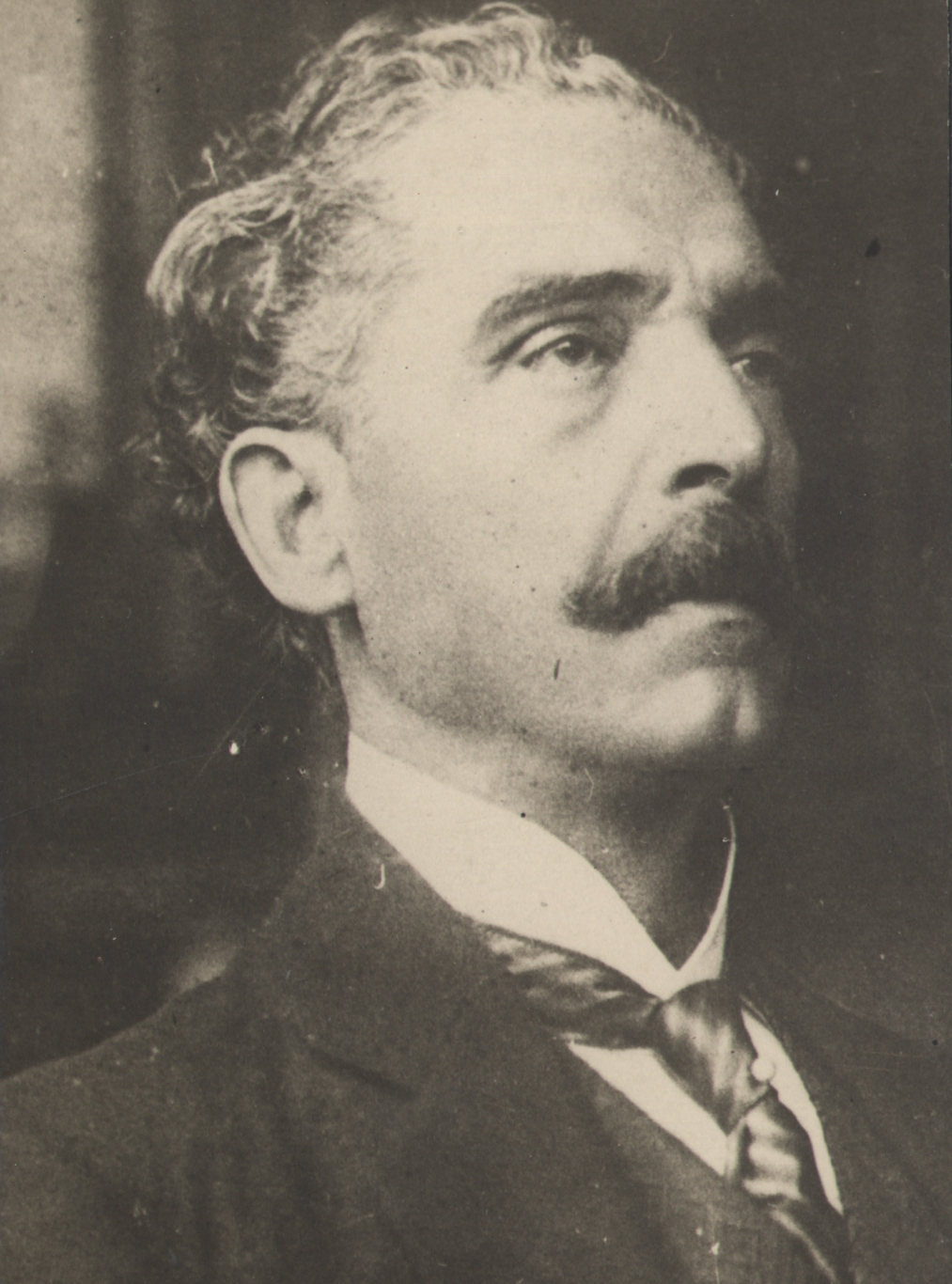

Vice President of the Federal Senate
- In office 22 July 1912 – 8 September 1915
- Preceded by: Quintino Bocaiuva
- Succeeded by: Antônio Azeredo
- In office 5 May 1902 – 21 November 1905
- Preceded by: Manoel de Queiroz
- Succeeded by: Joaquim Murtinho

Senator for Rio Grande do Sul
- In office 15 November 1890 – 8 September 1915
- Preceded by: Seat established by Decree No. 510 of 1890
- Succeeded by: Rivadávia Correia

Personal details
- Born: 8 May 1851 Cruz Alta, Rio Grande do Sul, Brazil
- Died: 8 September 1915 (aged 64) Rio de Janeiro, Federal District, Brazil
- Party: PRR (1882–1910); PRC (1910–1915)
- Spouse: Benedita Brasilina da Silva Araújo Moniz (m. 1876)
- Parents: Antônio Gomes Pinheiro Machado (father); Maria Manuela de Oliveira Aires (mother)
- Education: Faculty of Law of Largo de São Francisco

Military service
- Allegiance: Empire of Brazil; United States of Brazil
- Branch/service: Brazilian Army
- Years of service: 1866–1868; 1893–1895
- Rank: Brigadier general
- Battles/wars: Paraguayan War; Federalist Revolution; Battle of Passo Fundo

José Gomes Pinheiro Machado (8 May 1851 – 8 September 1915) was a Brazilian republican politician. He fought for the establishment of the Republic in Brazil and for its consolidation.

He fought on the republican side in the Federalist Revolution (Revolução Federalista), commanding the North Division (Divisão do Norte) and winning a victory over the monarchist forces at the battle of Passo Fundo in 1894.

He was a senator for the state of Rio Grande do Sul from 1890 until his assassination in 1915.

== Ancestry ==
Ancestors of Pinheiro Machado (politician)

8. Damião Cosme Albernaz
4. José Gomes Pinheiro Veloso
9. Joaquina Rosa Gomes Pinheiro Veloso
2. Antônio Gomes Pinheiro Machado
10. Maximiano de Góis e Siqueira Leite
5. Ana Florisbela Machado de Oliveira e Vasconcelos
11. Antônia Caetana Machado de Oliveira e Vasconcelos
1. José Gomes Pinheiro Machado
12. Salvador de Oliveira Aires
6. Salvador de Oliveira Leme Aires
13. Isabel da Conceição Nunes Vieira
3. Maria Manuela de Oliveira Aires
14. Domingos José Vieira Filho
7. Ana Nunes Vieira
15. Francisca Nunes de Siqueira

== See also ==
- History of Brazil (1889–1930)
- Senate of Brazil
