= Gumercindo Saraiva =

Brazilian soldier

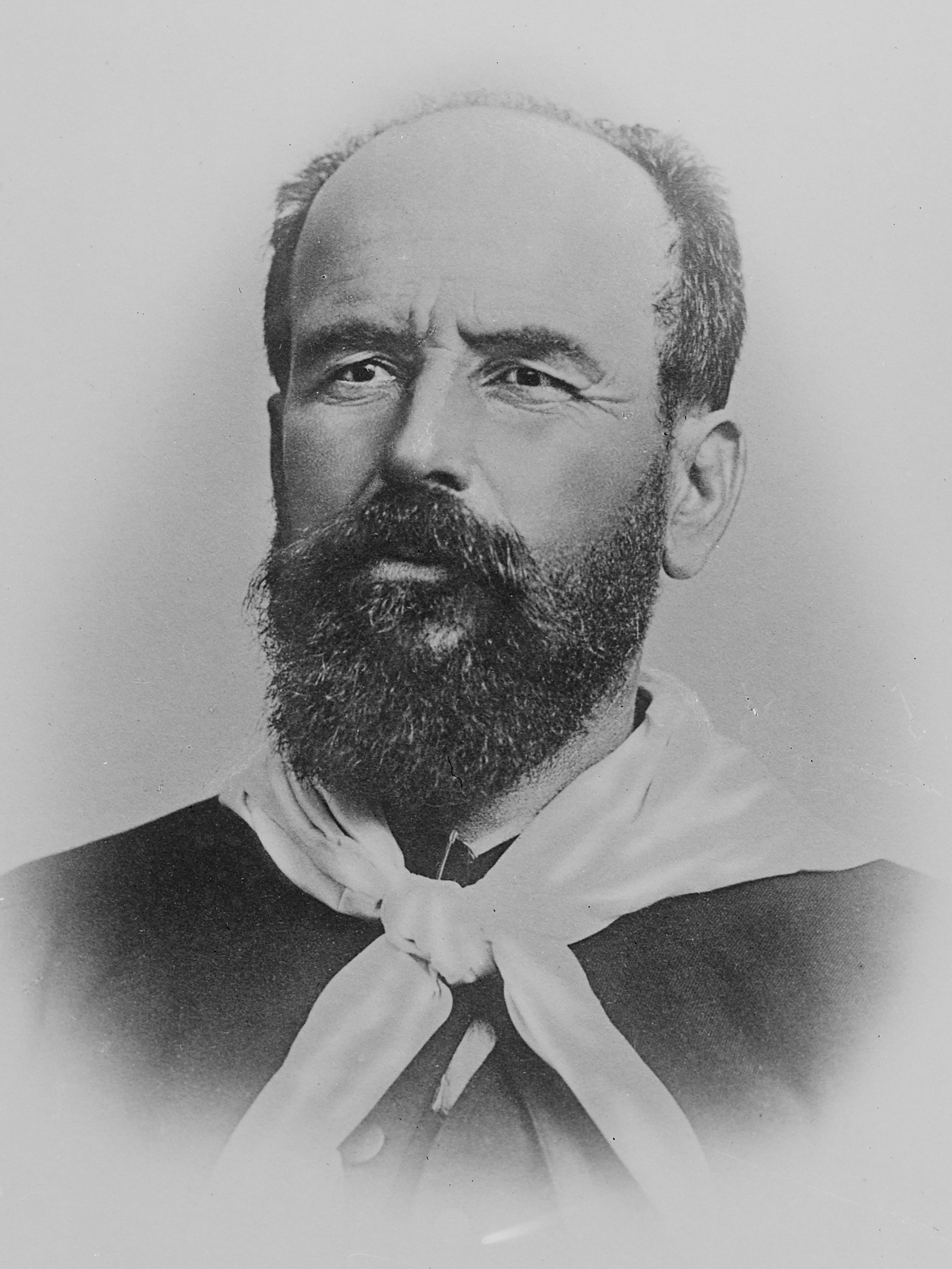
- Born: 13 January 1852; Arroio Grande, Rio Grande do Sul, Empire of Brazil
- Died: 10 August 1894 (aged 42); Capão do Cipó, Rio Grande do Sul, Brazil
- Relatives: Aparicio Saravia (brother)

Gumercindo Saraiva (13 January 1852 – 10 August 1894) was a Brazilian soldier, being one of the commanders of the rebel troops known as maragatos, during the Federalist Revolution.

== The beginning of the revolution ==
In 1892, the Government of Júlio de Castilhos entered a period of instability. With the state of Rio Grande do Sul at a boiling point, the Federalist Revolution was starting, with rebel troops being led by the general João Nunes da Silva Tavares, known as Joca Tavares. Saraiva decided to flee to Uruguay, where the rebel troops were gathering, after having refused to join the loyalist troops. On February 2, 1893, accompanied by his brother Aparicio Saravia and leading about 400 mounted troops, he crossed the border in a small town called Serrilhada, entering Rio Grande do Sul and joining the men of general Joca Tavares, thus forming the Liberator Army, a contingent of more than 3000 men.

Shortly, newcomers inflated the number of rebel troops to 12,000. Reportedly another of Gumercindo's brothers, Mariano, also took part in this revolt. In Uruguay, the three Saraiva brothers were known as the three of Cerro Largo. On April 4, 1893, the first battle against loyalist troops occurred. After several skirmishes with Government forces, realizing his disadvantage, Gumercindo Saraiva resorted to guerrilla tactics, with moderate success.

== The Maragatos go north ==
Gumercindo Saraiva and his troops headed for Dom Pedrito. From there they began a series of attacks against various regions of the state, destabilizing the positions held by loyalists. Then they headed north, advancing in November to Santa Catarina and Paraná, with detainees arriving at the city of Lapa, 60 kilometers southwest of Curitiba, and besieging it. On this occasion, colonel Gomes Carneiro, a loyalist officer, died in February 1894 without surrendering his position to the besiegers, in the episode which became known as the Siege of Lapa.

Admiral Custódio de Melo, leading the armed uprising against president Floriano Peixoto, joined the federalists and occupied the city of Desterro, currently Florianópolis. From there he went to Curitiba, where he met Saraiva. The resistance of Lapa prevented the advancement of the rebels. Gumercindo, unable to advance, retreated to Rio Grande do Sul. He died on August 10, 1894, after being hit by a bullet while recognizing the terrain on the eve of the battle of Carovi.

== Back to the pampas ==
After the fall of Lapa, Saraiva headed to Curitiba, finding it completely unguarded. He then left to Ponta Grossa, where he faced government troops who had received reinforcements from São Paulo, forcing him to retreat, beginning the withdrawal and return to Rio Grande do Sul, now beset by government troops.

Marching through three states, since his departure from Jaguarão until his return to the south, Gumercindo Saraiva and his troops traveled more than 3,000 km on horseback.

On June 27, 1894 he faced his last great battle. On 10 August he was killed by a gunshot wound to the chest, before the start of the battle of Carovi, the place became known as Capão da Batalha, today in the municipality of Capão do Cipó. In a war of atrocities on both sides, two days after Saraiva was buried in the cemetery of Santo Antônio de Capuchinhos, currently in the municipality of Itacurubi, his body was removed from the grave and had his head cut off and taken in a hatbox to governor Júlio de Castilhos. His body was later taken and buried in the municipal cemetery of Santa Vitória do Palmar, without the head.

== The consequences of the withdrawal of Gumercindo ==
With the arrival of Saraiva's troops to Desterro and Curitiba, government troops fled the cities, abandoning their positions and retreated, leaving only a few soldiers in the rear and the population abandoned to fend for themselves. In both cities, the political elite, merchants and industrialists, in order to avoid lootings, killings and rapes, decided to make a deal with Saraiva. In this deal it was decided that the rebel troops would respect an agreement of non-violence and in exchange the population would pay a war tribute. The deal was established and the population was spared.

But the Federalists, after successive struggles, were defeated and, with the return of the legal troops, a bloody retaliation tool place. This retaliation was in response to successive actions of extremism by the federalists led by Gumercindo Saraiva, which were marked by scenes of brutality:

"The soldiers would present themselves half-naked and enter houses to rip curtains in order to make clothes. In addition to looting, they raped women of any age and subjected men to vicious constraints, including merciless beheadings. These acts of violence were practiced in Lages, Blumenau, Itajaí, Desterro, São Francisco, Jaraguá and São Bento".

In Curitiba, on the imminence of the attack, the people turned to the Ildefonso Pereira Correia, former Baron of Serro Azul, as no other leader inspired confidence. The Government was disorganized. A governing junta was formed under the leadership of Ildenfonso Correia, able to contain the excesses of an unpoliced and dazed city. A loan of war was created and negotiations were held with Gumercindo regarding the invasion of Curitiba.

The same happened in Desterro, where the Manoel de Almeida Coelho da Gama Lobo d'Eça, former Baron of Batovi, presided over a tumultuous and historic meeting held on 29 September 1893, during which it was decided for capitulation against the rebel ships, which were mutinied against the vice-president of the Republic, which was in the office of President, Floriano Peixoto. Batovi didn't do but to surrender to the demands of the inhabitants of Desterro which were terrified and suddenly involved in the conflict.

In defense of the government of the Republic, president Floriano named and sent to Santa Catarina the fiery lieutenant colonel of the army Antônio Moreira César. At the same time troops of colonel Pires Ferreira occupied Curitiba, which was abandoned by the rebels. The commander of the military district, general Francisco Raimundo Ewerton Quadros, imposed martial law. In Paraná dozens of people, including civilians and soldiers, were executed summarily. In Santa Catarina that number rose to about 300 people.

== Bibliography ==
- GOYCOCHEA, Luiz Felipe Castilhos. Gumercindo Saraiva na Guerra dos Maragatos. Rio de Janeiro: Ed. Alba, 1943.
- MEIRINHO, Jali. República e Oligarquias: subsídios para a História Catarinense, 1899–1934. Florianópolis: Insular, 1997.
- CAVALARI, Rossano Viero. O Ninho dos Pica-paus-Cruz Alta na Revolução Federalista de 1893. Porto Alegre:Martins Livreiro Editor, 2001.
