= Gaspar da Silveira Martins =

Brazilian magistrate and politician (1835–1901)

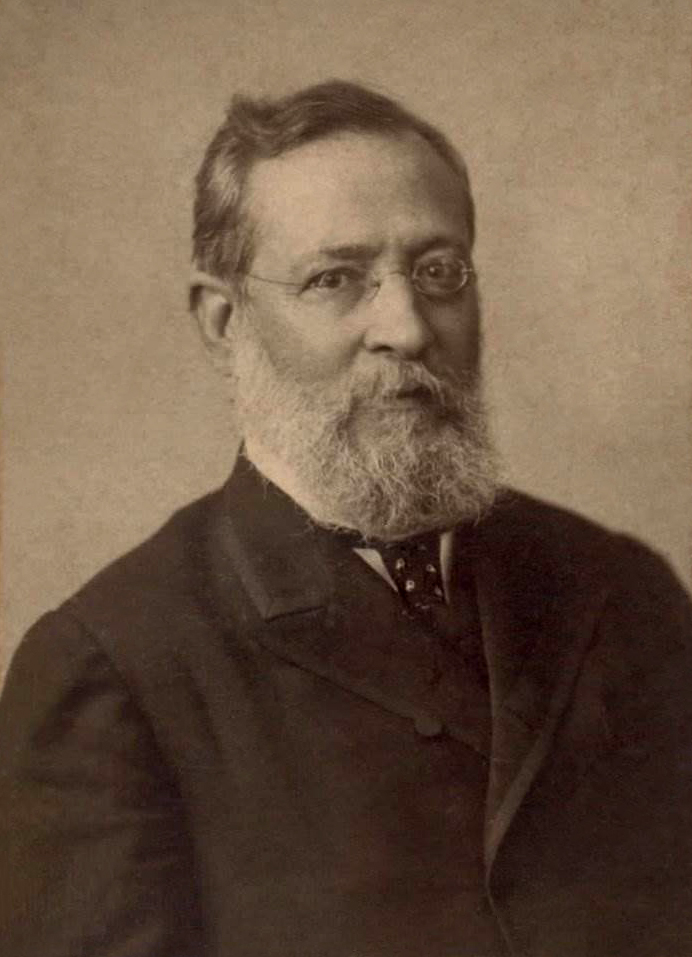
- Martins, 1874

President of Rio Grande do Sul
- In office 24 July 1889 – 6 November 1889
- Preceded by: Antônio Ferreira Prestes Guimarães
- Succeeded by: Justo de Azambuja Rangel

Senator for Rio Grande do Sul
- In office 1880–1889

Minister of Finance
- In office 1878–1879
- Preceded by: Viscount of Sinimbu
- Succeeded by: Viscount of Ouro Preto

Personal details
- Born: August 5, 1835 Cerro Largo Department, Uruguay
- Died: July 23, 1901 Montevideo, Uruguay
- Party: Liberal; Federalist

Gaspar da Silveira Martins (5 August 1835 – 23 July 1901) was a Brazilian magistrate and politician. He was a provincial and general deputy, provincial president, minister of finance and senator of the Empire of Brazil from 1880 to 1889.

== Biography ==
Gaspar da Silveira Martins was a lawyer and politician who began his public life as a municipal judge in Rio de Janeiro between 1858 and 1859. Later, he was a member of parliament (provincial and general), senator, minister of finance, president of the Province of Rio Grande do Sul and state councillor. He was born in Uruguayan territory five years after the country gained its independence from the Empire of Brazil. At this time, the geographical limits between Uruguay and southern Brazil remained imprecise and were only defined in 1851.

Early in his career, Silveira Martins was an anti-monarchist and liberal who harshly criticized the conservative governments of the 1870s. However, with the political developments of the time and the division of national politics into monarchists and republicans, he joined the monarchists and some conservatives who advocated parliamentarianism. In 1862, he was elected provincial deputy for Rio Grande do Sul and in 1865 he founded the newspaper A Reforma in Porto Alegre, which was later transferred to Rio de Janeiro and became the official media of the federalists from Rio Grande do Sul. In 1872, he was deputy general, but resigned in 1873, a few months after taking over the Ministry of Finance because he didn't support a government bill to declare non-Catholic citizens ineligible. In 1880, he was elected senator and faced tough political competition with Júlio de Castilhos, his historic adversary.

In 1889, Marshal Deodoro, a friend of Pedro II, agreed to participate in the campaign to depose Afonso Celso, the Viscount of Ouro Preto. However, Benjamin Constant informed him that Silveira Martins, a dislike of Deodoro, would be chosen to succeed Afonso Celso. This event triggered the proclamation of the Republic, because Marshal Deodoro couldn't accept seeing an enemy, who pejoratively called him a sargentão, as prime minister. As a result, Deodoro agreed to sign the decree establishing the provisional republican government.

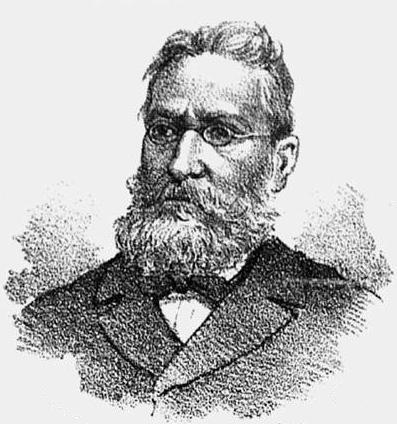
Gaspar da Silveira Martins.

After the deposition of Pedro II, Silveira Martins went into exile in Europe. In 1892, Marshal Deodoro granted him amnesty and he returned to Brazil, where he soon became dissatisfied with the conduct of the republican rulers. Upon his arrival, he attended meetings with other Brazilians who wanted to restore the parliamentary monarchy in Brazil. In one of them, he unsuccessfully insisted that Pedro II return to the country after Marshal Deodoro closed the National Congress. Next, he proposed to Princess Isabel that she allow her eldest son, Pedro, Prince of Grão-Pará, to be acclaimed Pedro III. In response, Princess Isabel stated that "first and foremost, she was a Catholic and, as such, she could not leave the education of her son, whose soul she had to save, to the Brazilians". Outraged, Silveira Martins replied: "Then, madam, you are destined for the convent."

At a congress in Bagé, Silveira Martins proposed a constitutional reform and the implementation of parliamentarianism, in an effort to avoid an armed conflict; however, he was defeated. In 1893, the Federalist Revolution began between those who defended greater powers for the President of the Republic and those who supported the decentralization of power, with more involvement from the states. In 1896, after the victory of Júlio de Castilhos, Silveira Martins organized a new congress of the Federalist Party, which continued to fight for parliamentarianism and a federal unitary state, in opposition to the 1891 Constitution. He gradually withdrew from political life and settled in the Tacuarembó Department, Uruguay. He died in Montevideo, Uruguay, on July 23, 1901

Paulo José Pires Brandão, grandson of Conselheiro Antônio Ferreira Viana, met Silveira Martins at his grandfather's house. In his book Vultos do Meu Caminho, he describes him as follows:

Tall, burly, with big glasses, an open white beard, very red skin. He didn't know how to speak softly, and even when he did, it was in the tone of a speech, and his clear, sonorous and strong voice invaded the room he was in, the corridors, the hall, the whole house, even across the street. He didn't speak into anyone's ear, he didn't tell secrets, nor did he have any, because his voice didn't allow for whispers, he didn't whisper: he tongued.

== See also ==
- Brazilian Naval Revolt
- Federalist Revolution
