= Gomes Carneiro =

Brazilian general

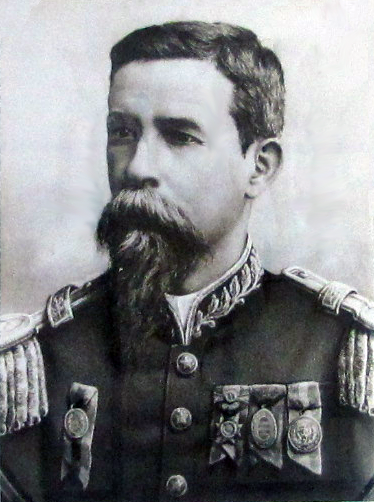
- Born: 28 November 1846; Serro, Minas Gerais, Empire of Brazil
- Died: 9 February 1894 (aged 47) Lapa, Paraná, Brazil
- Buried: Panteão dos Heroes (City of Lapa)
- Allegiance: Empire of Brazil; Brazil
- Branch: Imperial Brazilian Army; Brazilian Army
- Rank: Colonel
- Conflicts: Paraguayan War; Federalist Revolution

Antônio Ernesto Gomes Carneiro (28 November 1846 – 9 February 1894) was a Brazilian army officer and veteran of the Paraguayan War. Antônio Ernesto Gomes Carneiro fought on the side of the Republican government in the Federalist Revolution, where he was killed in action, during the Siege of Lapa. Carneiro died unaware of his promotion to Brigade General, which was awarded the day prior to his death, for his actions in battle.

Carneiro began his military career when he graduated from the Instituto Militar de Engenharia (Brazilian military academy) in 1872. In 1875 Carneiro received the rank of lieutenant and was subsequently awarded the rank of captain in 1877. He was then promoted to the rank of major in 1887, a lieutenant colonel in 1890, and finally a colonel in 1892. Antônio Ernesto Gomes Carneiro would remain a colonel until his promotion to Brigade General one day prior to his death.

== Bibliography ==
- LACERDA, Francisco Brito de. Cerco da Lapa: do começo ao fim. Curitiba, PR: Lítero-Técnica, 1985. 157 p.
