= Maragato (Brazil) =

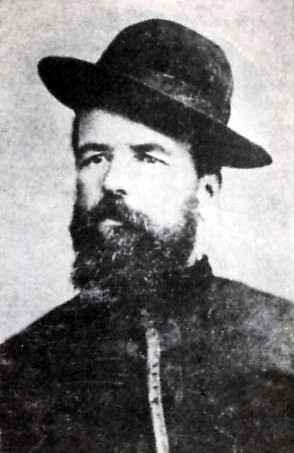
Gumercindo Saraiva was the main leader of the Federalists.

Maragato is a name given in Brazil to the southerners who initiated the Federalist Revolution (1893-1895) in protest against the federal government. The conflict affected the entire southern region of the country.

In the state of Rio Grande do Sul the movement was represented by Silveira Martins.

They wore red neckerchiefs for identification, symbolizing their opposition.

== Origin ==
The term used to have a pejorative connotation attributed by loyalists to the rebels that were led by Gaspar da Silveira Martins, one of the most prominent politicians by the end of the monarchy and eminent commander, and the strategist caudillo, Gumercindo Saraiva, who left exile in Uruguay and entered Rio Grande do Sul at the head of an army wearing red neckerchiefs.

The name Maragato (originally pejorative, then embraced by the rebels themselves) came from the fact that their leaders had been in exile in a region of Uruguay heavily populated by emigrants from La Maragatería in Spain, trying to demeaning the rebels as foreign federalists.

== Revolution of 1923 (Maragatos x Chimangos) ==
The Revolution of 1923 was an armed movement that lasted 11 months but, differently than 1893, took place only in the brazilian state of Rio Grande do Sul.

This time, on one side were the supporters of Borges de Medeiros against Assis Brasil.

In this case, the maragatos, Assis Brasil allies, rebelled against the central power of the Borges de Medeiros' chimangos, who was the successor of Julio de Castilhos. Chimangos was a movement where members were recognized by a white neckerchiefs and were known by the so called "republican dictatorship".

== Chimangos ==
Borges de Medeiros' fellow supporter broke off the alliance and published a book criticizing the ruler using the pseudonym of Antonio Chimango – Poemeto Campestre. In the story, Antonio Chimango's character used to ruled an estancia in São Pedro and used questionable methods to rule, such as Borges de Medeiros.

The book attracted the attention and became popular. All the supporters of Borges de Medeiros started being pejoratively called "Chimangos" as the prey (similar to a hawk) that usually feeds on carrion.
