= Federalist Revolution =

Civil war in Brazil

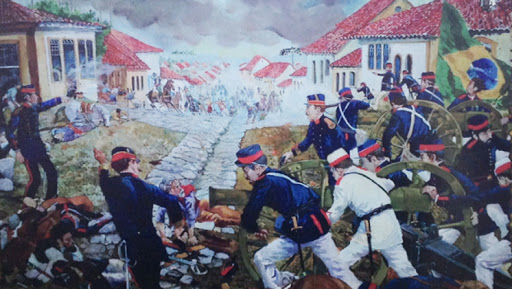
- The Siege of Lapa in 1894
Date	2 February 1893 – 23 August 1895
Location	Southern Brazil
Result	Government victory

Belligerents
Brazil	Federalist rebels; Navy rebels; Uruguayan volunteers

Commanders and leaders
Floriano Peixoto; Júlio de Castilhos; Pinheiro Machado; Hipólito Ribeiro; Gomes Carneiro †; Moreira César	Silveira Martins; Gumercindo Saraiva †; Joca Tavares; Saldanha da Gama †; Custódio de Melo; Aparício Saraiva

Strength
22,000 soldiers and militia	7,500 federalist rebels ~500 rebel sailors

Casualties and losses
- approx. 10,000 dead

The Federalist Revolution (Portuguese: Revolução Federalista) was a civil war that took place in southern Brazil between 1893 and 1895, fought by the federalists, opponents of Rio Grande do Sul state president (Note: Under the 1891 Brazilian Constitution, the first republican constitution of Brazil, the head of the executive branch in the states was called "president" instead of the current title of "governor".) Júlio de Castilhos, seeking greater autonomy for the state and decentralization of power by the newly installed First Brazilian Republic.

Inspired by the monarchist ideologies of Gaspar da Silveira Martins, who had been one of the most prominent politicians by the end of the monarchy and acted as political head of the revolution, the federalists had Gumercindo Saraiva as the military head supported by his brother Aparicio Saraiva, of the Uruguayan National Party, and by the Navy rebels who, after being defeated at the capital following the Rio de Janeiro Affair, moved south to strengthen the federalist forces. Also known as maragatos, the federalists fought the republican forces of the Brazilian Army headed by the Rio Grande do Sul senator and army general Pinheiro Machado.

The conflict was not limited to Rio Grande do Sul, affecting the entire southern region of the country, which was mostly under federalist control. The rebels' objective was to group the forces against the republican government of Floriano Peixoto and march to the capital, Rio de Janeiro, to depose him. The federalists effectively installed a parallel government by deposing the presidents of the states they controlled and holding elections and by adhering to the proclamation by the navy rebels of Prince Pedro de Alcântara as emperor Pedro III. Nonetheless, after the Siege of Lapa, the federalists were unable to advance further, being defeated in the Battle of Campo Osório. The end of the war consolidated the young Brazilian republic, leaving 10,000 dead, many of which were beheaded. The common practice of beheading of prisoners of war is the reason why the war is sometimes nicknamed as Guerra das Degolas (War of the Beheadings).

== Background ==
During the nineteenth century, the province of Rio Grande do Sul was often in a state of war. In the Ragamuffin War (1835-1845) and in the Paraguayan War (1864-1870), the population of Rio Grande do Sul was devastated. In the last years of the Brazilian Empire, three antagonistic political leaders appeared in the region: the liberal Assis Brasil, the conservative Pinheiro Machado and positivist Júlio de Castilhos. The three met to found the Riograndense Republican Party (Partido Republicano Rio-Grandense) (PRR), which opposed the Federalist Party of Rio Grande do Sul, founded and led by the liberal monarchist Gaspar da Silveira Martins. In 1889, with the Proclamation of the Republic, these currents came into conflict, so that in only two years the now state of Rio Grande do Sul would have eighteen presidents.

=== Panorama of Castilhos ===
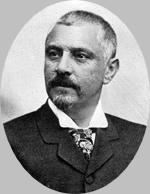
Júlio de Castilhos, president-dictator of the state of Rio Grande do Sul

Júlio de Castilhos was born and raised in a gaúcho resort and studied Law in the Faculty of Law of São Paulo, where he had contact with the positivist ideas of Auguste Comte. After graduating, he returned to his homeland and began to write in the newspaper The Federation (Brazilian Portuguese: A Federação), attacking the monarchical government, slavery and his political opponent Gaspar da Silveira Martins. He was a constituent congressman in 1890-1891, and believed in a dictatorial phase to consolidate the Brazilian Republic, defending a strong centralization of power in the republished dictator.

Defeated in the national constituent assembly, he implanted his ideas in Rio Grande do Sul's state constitution, months later, in a text he wrote almost entirely by himself, ignoring suggestions from the commission of jurists highlighted for the task, and approved it in July 1891 at a controlled state assembly by the Riograndense Republican Party, led by him and of positivist orientation. The state constitution foresaw that the laws would not be drafted by the state parliament, but by the chief executive, who could be re-elected for new mandates. As the vote was not secret, the elections would be easily manipulated by the followers of Castilhos, which would guarantee him to remain in power indefinitely.

In the same month that he approved his constitution, he was elected governor. In November, for having supported the coup led by president Deodoro da Fonseca who ordered the closing of the National Congress, he was deposed and replaced by a government junta that lasted little and soon passed the government to general Domingos Barreto Leite. Castilhos resumed a parallel government and was re-elected in a contest without competitors, taking possession in January 1893. At that moment, the state was the "nerve point of the Republic" and the answer of the opponents was imminent.

=== Panorama of Martins ===
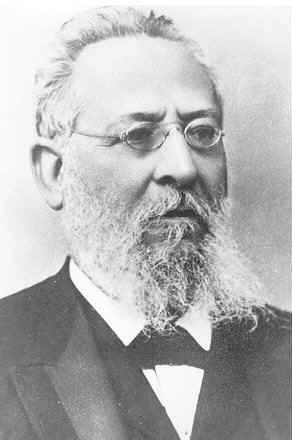
Gaspar da Silveira Martins, monarchist and founder of the Federalist Party.

Gaspar da Silveira Martins, an intellectual and a good orator, had been appointed minister by emperor Pedro II in one of his last acts in an attempt to save the monarchy. After the proclamation of the Republic, he was imprisoned and sent into exile in Europe, returning to Rio Grande do Sul in 1892 with the state already under the government of Júlio de Castilhos; there he founded the Federalist Party of Rio Grande do Sul, that defended the parliamentary system of government and the revision of the state constitution. With the possession of Castilhos, Gumercindo Saraiva would also return to the state, coming from his refuge in Uruguay and leading a band of five hundred men. A second group, commanded by general João Nunes da Silva Tavares, occupied another region of the state with a force of three thousand men. Threatened, the governor convinced the then president of Brazil Floriano Peixoto that the uprising was an attempt by Silveira Martins to restore the monarchy. And indeed, it was. Silveira Martins, for being a declared monarchist, participated in meetings with other Brazilians who had the goal of restoring the parliamentary monarchy in Brazil. On that occasion he proposed to Isabel, Princess Imperial of Brazil to allow the soldiers linked to the Navy Revolt to take her eldest son, Pedro de Alcântara, Prince of Grão-Pará, to be acclaimed as emperor Pedro III, whom the princess refused to fear for her son.

=== Pica-paus and Maragatos ===
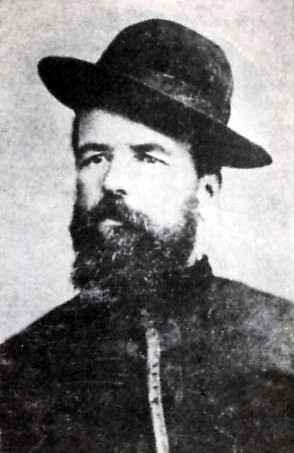
Gumercindo Saraiva, leader of the Maragatos.

The followers of Gaspar da Silveira Martins, gasparistas or maragatos (federalists), were frontally opposed to the followers of Júlio de Castilhos, the castilhistas, pica-paus (woodpeckers) or ximangos (republicans).

The followers of Júlio de Castilhos received the nickname of pica-paus or ximangos, due to the color of the uniform used by the soldiers who defended that faction, that resembled the birds of the region. This denomination extended to all the castilhistas, including civilians. The term maragato, which was used to refer to the political current that Gaspar da Silveira Martins defended, had a more complex explanation:

"In the province of Leon, Spain, there is a district called Maragateria, whose inhabitants have the name of maragatos, and that, according to some, it is a town of condemnable customs; therefore, living to wander from one point to another, with Freighters, selling and buying robberies and in turn robbing animals, they are a species of gypsies." -Romaguera.

The Spanish maragatos were eminently nomadic, and adopted professions that allowed them to be in constant displacement. In Uruguay, the inhabitants of the city of San José de Mayo were called maragatos, perhaps because their first inhabitants were descendants of the Spanish maragatos, who were responsible for bringing to the region of the River Plate the custom of the bombacha.

At the time of the revolution, legalistic republicans used this appeal as pejorative, with the meaning of "mercenaries." The reality offered some basis for this assertion - Gumercindo Saraiva, one of the leaders of the revolution, had entered Rio Grande do Sul from Uruguay by the border of Aceguá, in the Cerro Largo Department, commanding soldiers that included natives from that country. The family of Gumercindo, although of Brazilian origin, owned land in Cerro Largo. However, giving this nickname to the revolutionaries was a backfire. The denomination gained sympathy, and the rebels themselves came to be denominated maragatos. In 1896, they even created a newspaper bearing that name.

== The war ==
=== Federalist offensive ===
==== Beginning ====
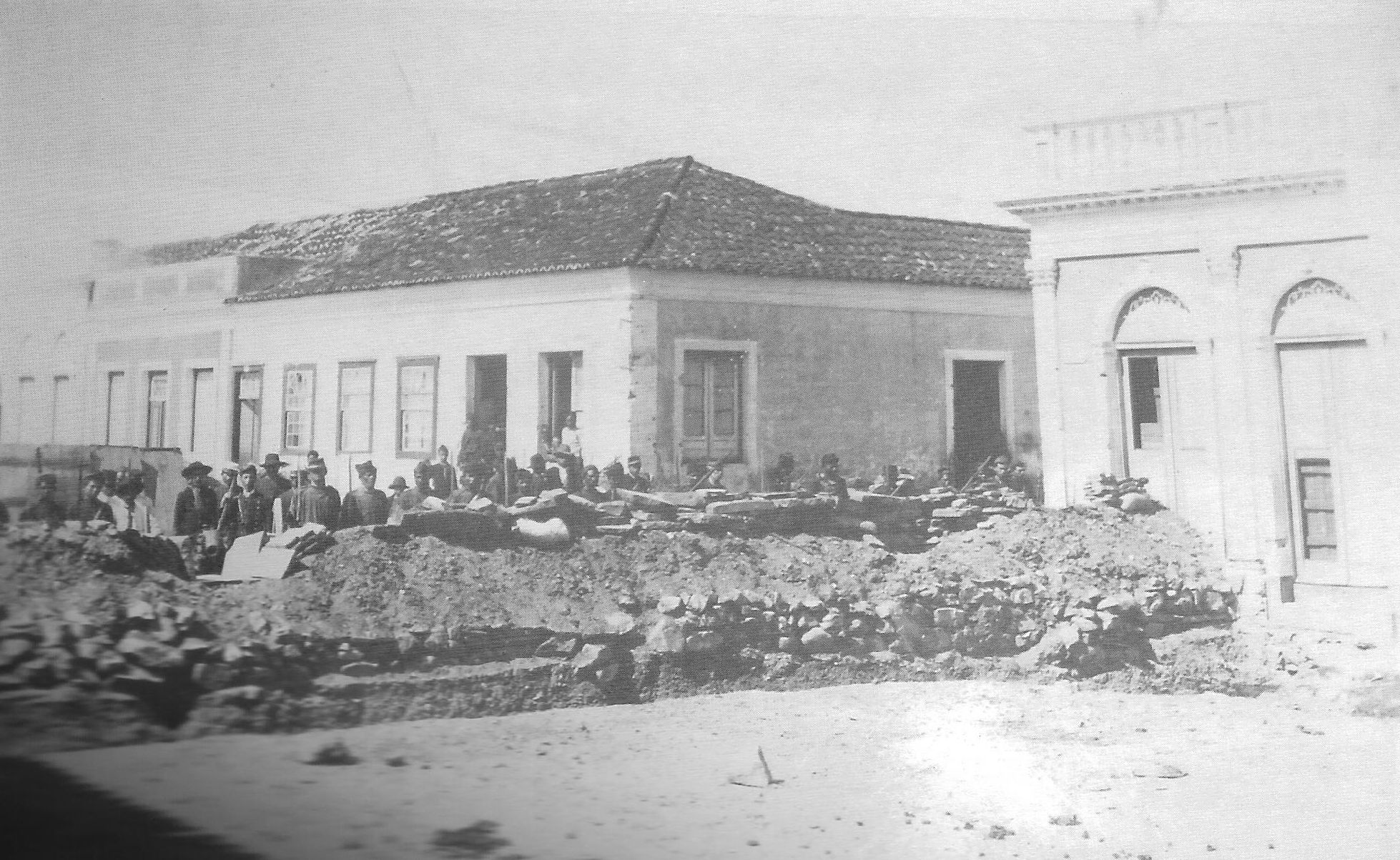
Trench on the sete de setembro st. during the siege of Bagé, 1893.

The disagreements began with the concentration of troops under the command of maragato João Nunes da Silva Tavares, referred to as Joca Tavares, formerly the Baron of Itaqui, in fields of the woodworking, in Uruguay, locality near Bagé. Shortly after the potrero of Ana Correia, coming from Uruguay towards Rio Grande do Sul, was the federalist Gumercindo Saraiva.

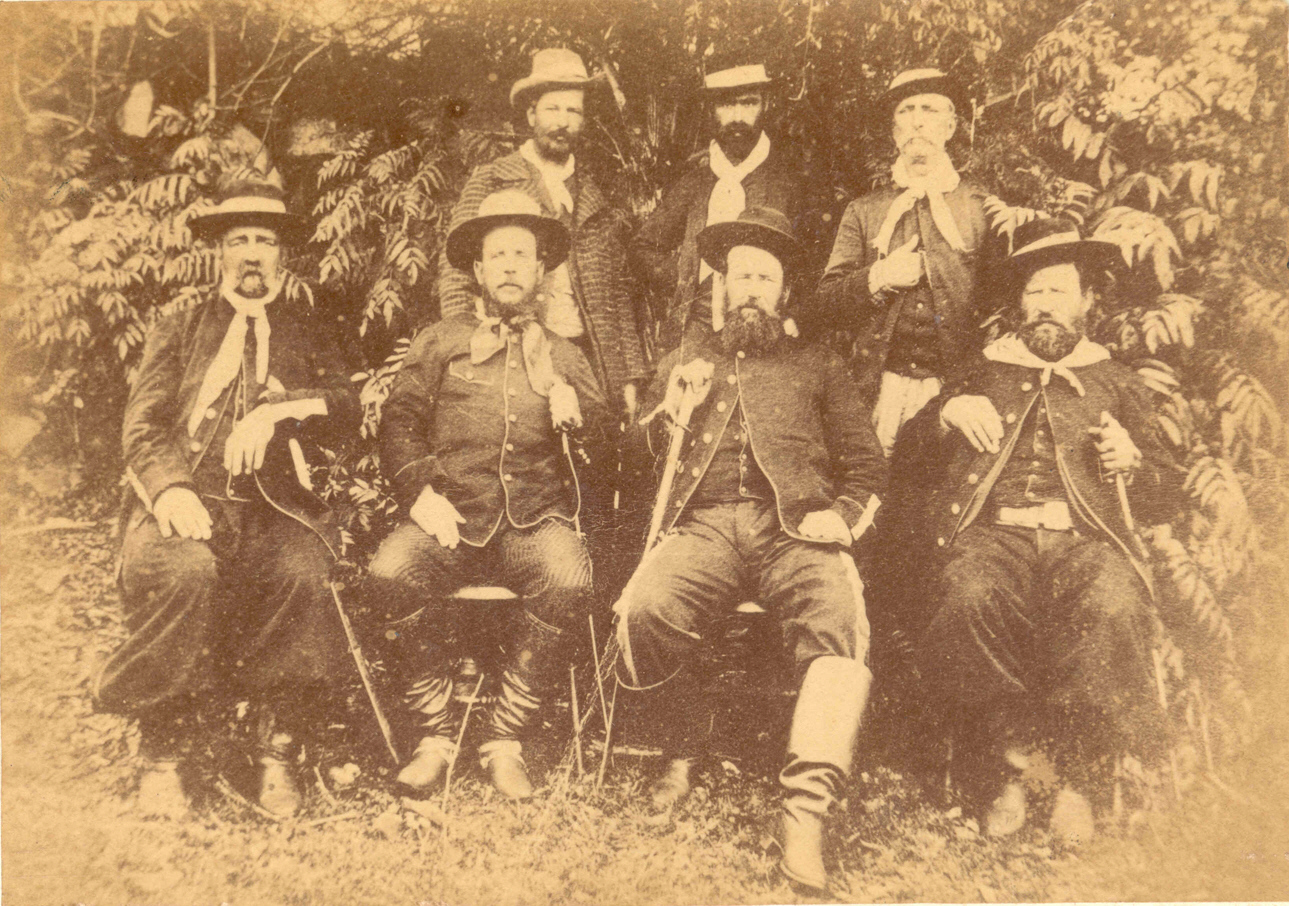
Gumercindo Saraiva and Maragato commanders

Efficiently, the maragatos dominated the border, demanding the deposition of Júlio de Castilhos, who had been elected president of the state by direct vote. There was also the desire for a plebiscite where the people should choose the system of government. Due to the seriousness of the movement, the rebellion quickly acquired nationwide attention, threatening the stability of the state's government and the republican regime throughout Brazil. Floriano Peixoto, then in the Presidency of the Republic, sent federal troops under the command of general Hipólito Ribeiro to rescue Júlio de Castilhos. Three divisions were strategically organized, called legalists: the northern, the capital and the center. In addition to these, the state police and all its contingent were called to fight the rebels.

The first victory of the maragatos was in May 1893, next to the brook Inhanduí, in Alegrete. In this fight along with the legalistic pica-paus took part senator Pinheiro Machado, who had left his seat in the Federal Senate to organize the Division of the North, which he led during all the conflict.

==== Maragatos advance ====
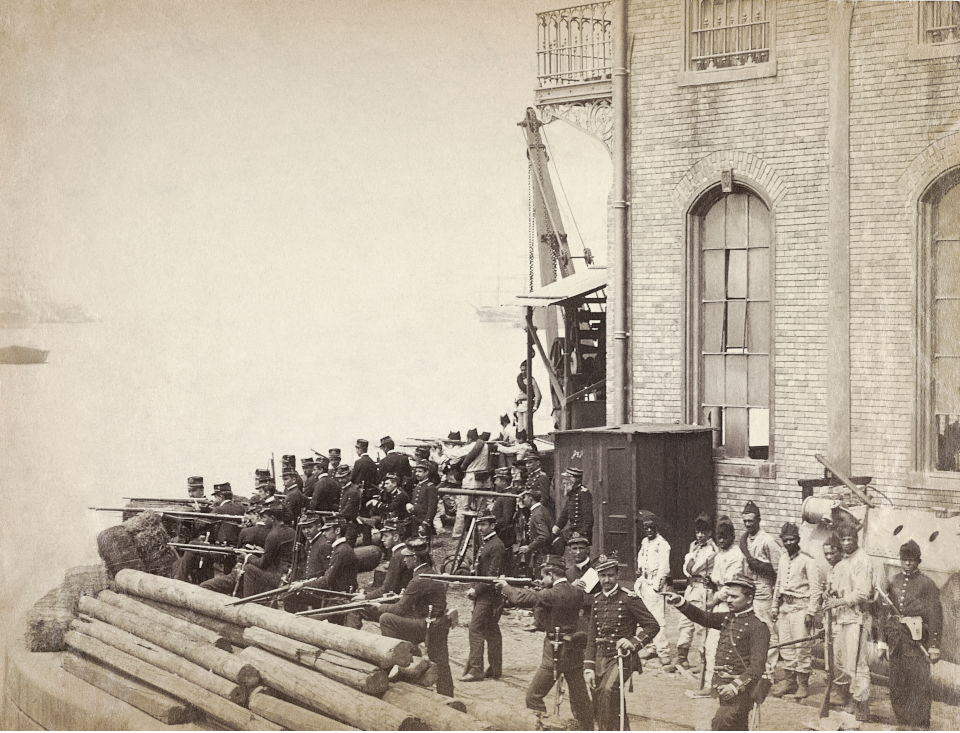
The Navy Revolt in Rio de Janeiro, led by admirals Custódio de Melo and Saldanha da Gama, joined the federalists and later fought in the south, giving them land troops support.

Gumercindo Saraiva and his troops went to Dom Pedrito, from there they began a series of lightning attacks against several points of the state, destabilizing the positions conquered by the Republicans. They then headed north, advancing in November on Santa Catarina state and arriving in Paraná, being stopped in the city of Lapa, sixty kilometers southwest of Curitiba. At the time, president Floriano Peixoto called a veteran of the Paraguayan War, colonel Gomes Carneiro. His orders were to halt the revolution. In five days, he Carneiro came to the area to replace general Argolo. It was November 1893 and the revolutionary troops were now advancing towards the state of Paraná. On this occasion, colonel Carneiro died defending the besieged city of Lapa in February 1894 without surrendering his positions to the rebels, in the episode that came to be known as the siege of Lapa. The fierce resistance opposed to the federalist troops in the city of Lapa, by colonel Carneiro, frustrated the rebellious pretensions to arrive at the capital of the Republic.

In the capital, the Revolt of the Navy began, under the leadership of the monarchist admiral Custódio José de Melo, who also fought against Floriano. After some exchange of gunfire with the army, the navy rebels went south. After docking in the city of Desterro, renamed to Florianópolis after the war, they proclaimed the city as a new capital of the federalist regime. Interests meant that the two revolts came to join.

"They have joined forces to overthrow Floriano. By sea, Custódio de Melo was responsible for striking Paranaguá, which happened in January 1894" says the judge and scholar Paul Hapner. By land, Gumercindo Saraiva advanced towards the state capital.

==== Siege of Lapa ====
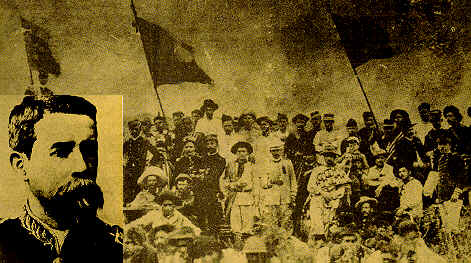
Loyalist colonel Gomes Carneiro and the "martyrs" of Lapa.

In the same period that the coast was taken, the maragatos passed by Tijucas do Sul and came to Lapa - only 60 km away from Curitiba, capital of the state of Paraná.

The state was in chaos. With the advance of the rebels, the state governor, Vicente Machado, fled from Curitiba. With only 639 men, few weapons and food shortages, colonel Carneiro had a mission to contain the Federalists in Lapa. During 26 days, Carneiro and his army resisted the attacks of 3,000 soldiers commanded by Gumercindo Saraiva. "The troops of the maragatos made a real siege to the city," says Hapner. At least 500 people died in the siege of Lapa, including Carneiro. With the death of the commander in February, Lapa surrendered and left the passage open for the revolutionaries to take Curitiba.

Despite the defeat, the battle in Lapa was critical for the Republican victory. Hapner considers the siege to have been a strategic error of the maragatos: "If they wanted to go to Rio de Janeiro, they should not have wasted time in Lapa. This gave Floriano's army enough time to organize, ultimately defeating the Federalists", he says. For the historian Dennisson de Oliveira, "This was a mythical episode that, to the power established under Floriano, 'saved' the Republic." After the battle, Gumercindo Saraiva, unable to advance, retired to Rio Grande do Sul. He died on 10 August 1894, after being shot by treason while recognizing the terrain on the eve of the Battle of Carovi.

=== Republican offensive ===
==== Federalist occupation and release of Curitiba ====
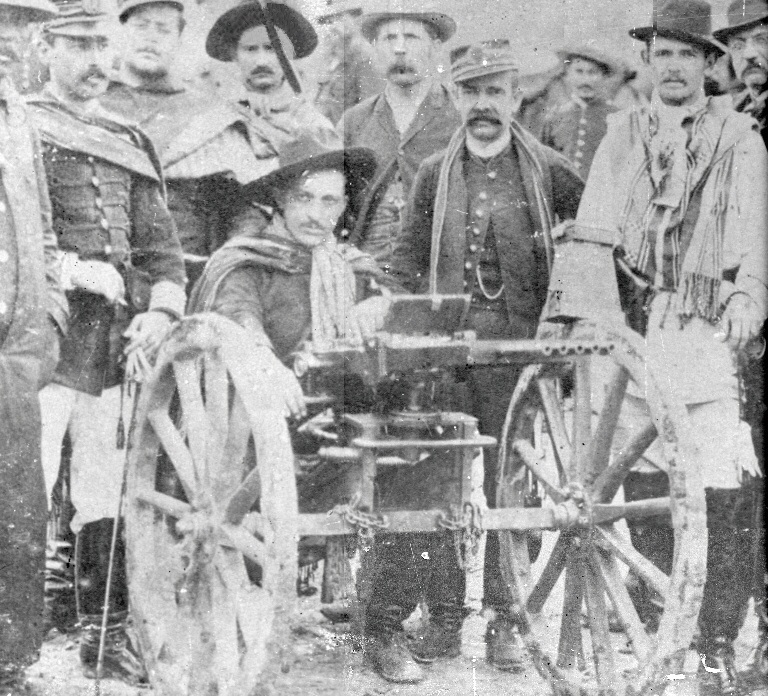
Loyalist troops in 1894.

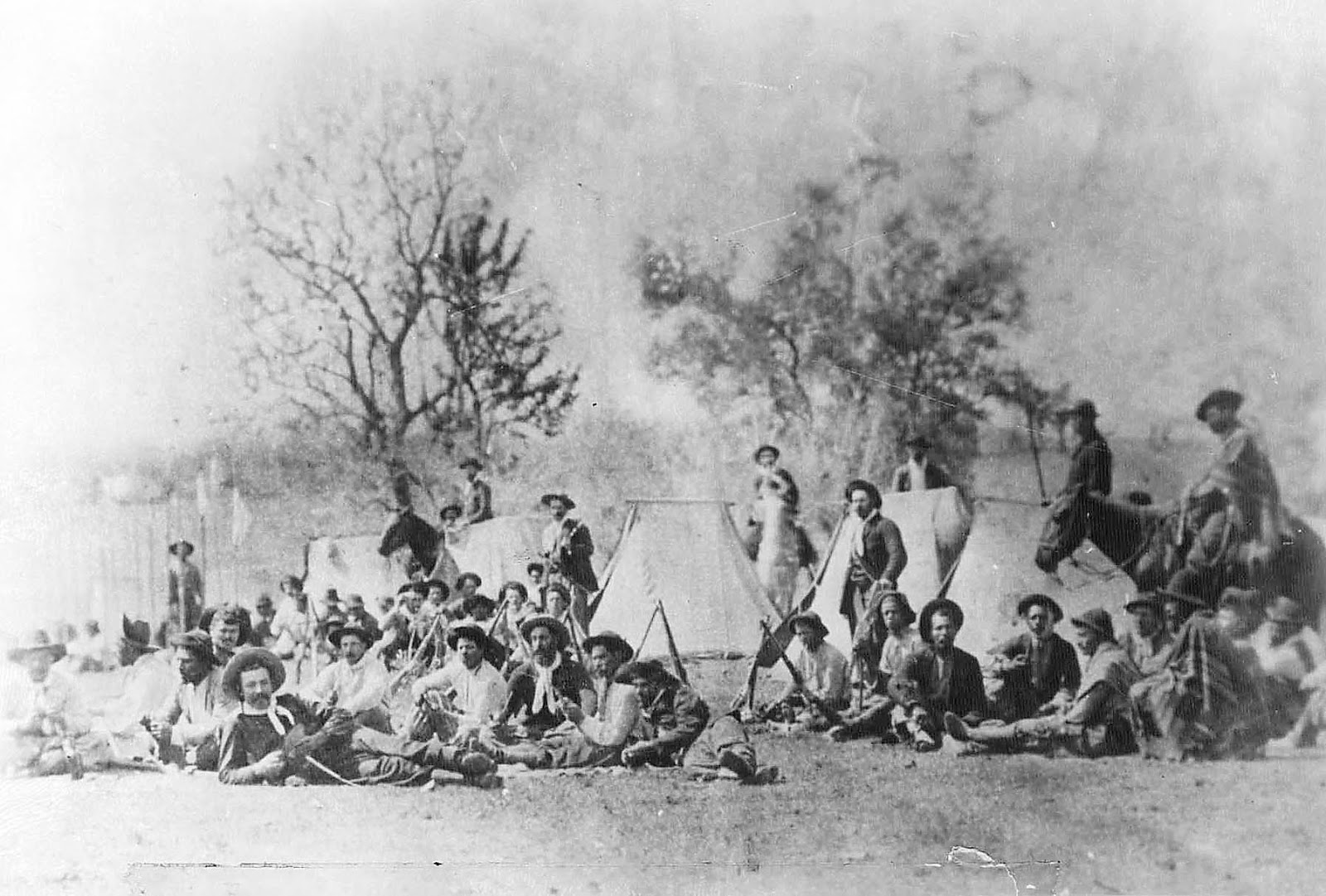
Federalist troops in 1895.

At dawn on 17 January 1894, a rebel brigade commanded by general João Meneses Dória took the Serrinha train and telegraphic station. With the complicity of the officials there, he began to respond to telegraph calls as if he were the loyalist troops of Lapa, warning that thousands of federalist rebels were marching towards Curitiba. There was panic in the capital and general Pego, the city's military commander, fled abandoning trains loaded with war material. Following the take over of Paranaguá, Tijucas do Sul and Lapa, and with the absence of a government and military forces in Paraná, the rebels easily entered Curitiba with a little force of 150 cavalrymen and a train which disembarked the federalist high officials.

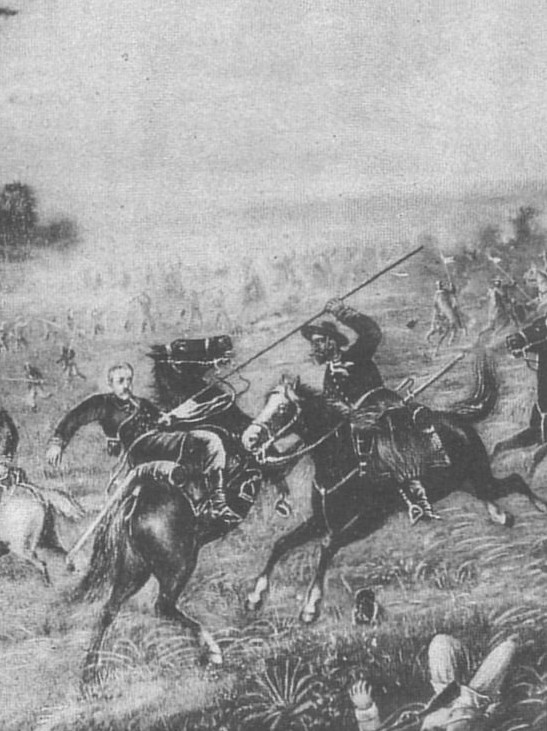
The death of Admiral Saldanha da Gama at the Battle of Campo Osório in 1895.

According to scholar Paul Hapner, evacuation of loyalist troops ordered by general Pego caused chaos in the city. Gumercindo Saraiva and Custódio de Melo had no obstacle. The city was firstly administered by a governative junta headed by Ildefonso Pereira Correia (the former Baron of Serro Azul). Correia was called by the citizens to make an agreement with the revolutionaries to protect the population from violence, looting and rape. The Governing Junta of Curitiba became the "Commission for Launching the War Loan" for the purpose of raising funds for the rebels and thereby buying the city's protection. Although Correia and the merchants who supported the commission only sought to prevent looting and disorder, their actions committed them as collaborators with the rebel movement.

As the loyalist governor had been virtually e and fled the capital, the federalist leaders appointed a governor for Paraná - colonel Teófilo Soares Gomes, who remained in power for only 20 days. "Then they gathered in a mansion that existed in the Alto da Glória and appointed another governor, João Meneses Dória, who remained until March" reports Hapner. After him, three others were appointed governors: Francisco José Cardoso Júnior, Tertuliano Teixeira de Freitas. The last maragato governor in Paraná was José Antonio Ferreira Braga, in early May 1894. Soon after, as the federalists were unable to advance further following the military victory but strategical mistake at the siege of Lapa, they were forced to release Curitiba and hold their position back in Lapa, ultimately further retreating to Rio Grande do Sul, abandoning Curitiba, which was taken back by the republican forces.

==== Battle of Campo Osório ====
On 24 June 1895 the Battle of Campo Osório, the last battle of the uprising, held along the border with Uruguay near Santana do Livramento, took place. Admiral Saldanha da Gama, with the federalists, led 400 rebels, 100 of which being revolting navy sailors. They were attacked by a cavalry regiment of the Brazilian Army that counted 1,300 cavalrymen, led by General Hipólito Ribeiro. In the course of the battle, admiral Saldanha da Gama, twice wounded by spears, was killed along with most of his men, many executed by sticking after surrender. The victorious legalists suffered about 200 casualties.

== End of conflict ==
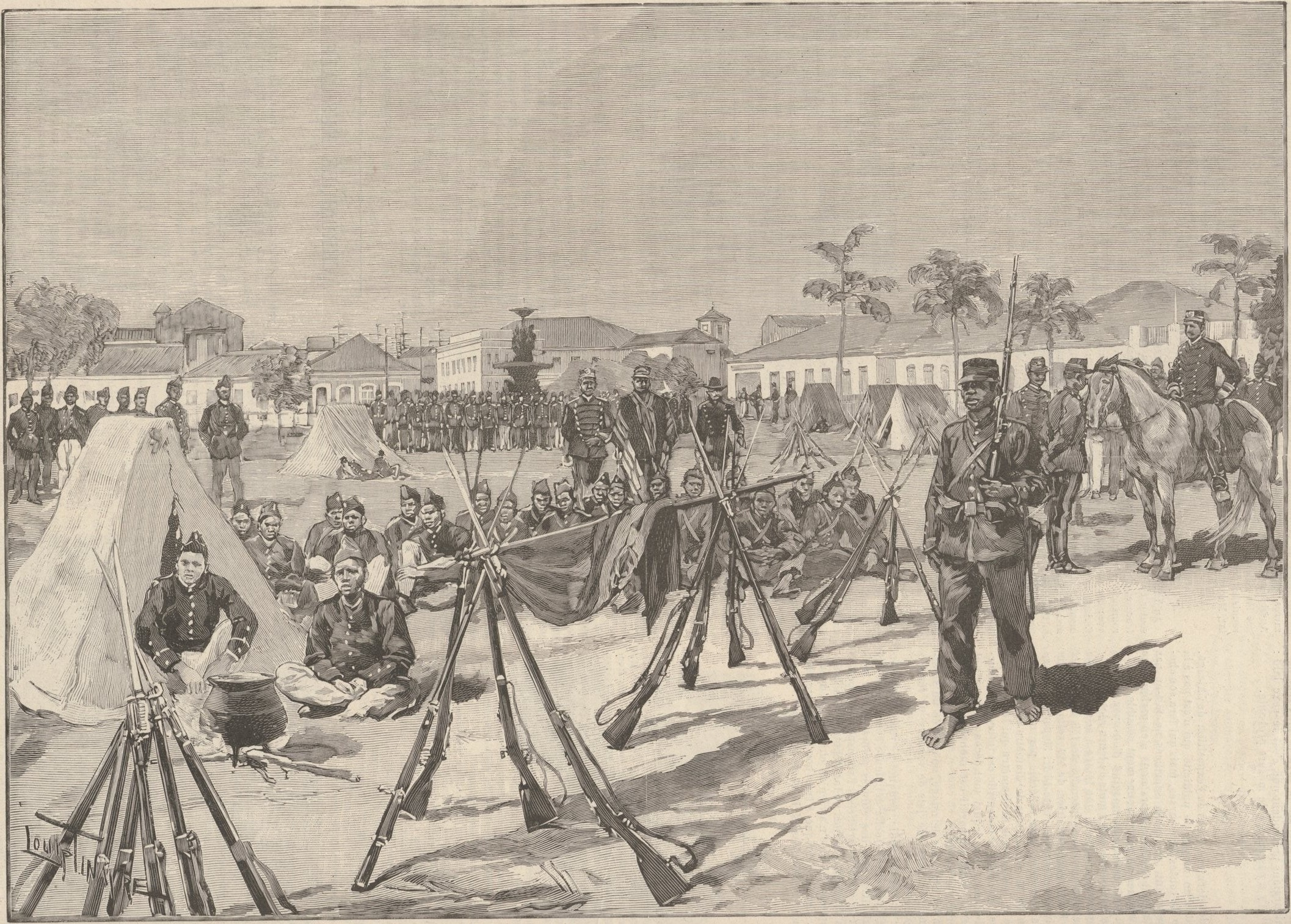
The 32º infantry battalion occupying the Praça 7 de Setembro in Rio Grande do Sul, after the defeat of the Federalists (Le Monde Illustré, nº 1.941, 06/09/1894, drawing by L. Tinayre, according to photographs provided by Emite Tancke).

=== Peace treaty ===
Following the defeat at the battle of Campo Osório, the federalists were left without any forces and started negotiating a ceasefire with the loyalist forces on behalf of the republican government. With Gumercindo Saraiva and Saldanha da Gama dead, Custódio de Melo exiled and Silveira Martins organizing a new federalist congress in Porto Alegre, Joca Tavares, the last military leader of the federalists, and Inocêncio Galvão, on behalf of president Prudente de Morais, signed a peace treaty in Pelotas on 23 August 1895 by which the republican government promised not to punish the federalists. "Peace was made and in such conditions that the republic and the authority that represents were left unharmed. It was also done without humiliation for the rebels, in honorable and satisfactory terms for all. In fact, the terms were far more satisfying to the legalists. The Rio Grande do Sul state constitution was not modified, and Júlio de Castilhos remained in government until 1898."

Historian Rafael Sêga, from the Federal Technological University of Paraná, explains: "The version that the Republic was imposed without blood was created by the ruling class, which wanted to legitimize itself. The 1889 coup caught the country off guard and it took three or four years for grievances to surface and the Empire's elites, jettisoned from power, to react. The Federalist Revolution opened the door to a series of bloody conflicts, such as Canudos and Contestado. The history of Brazil is anything but peaceful."

=== Outcome ===
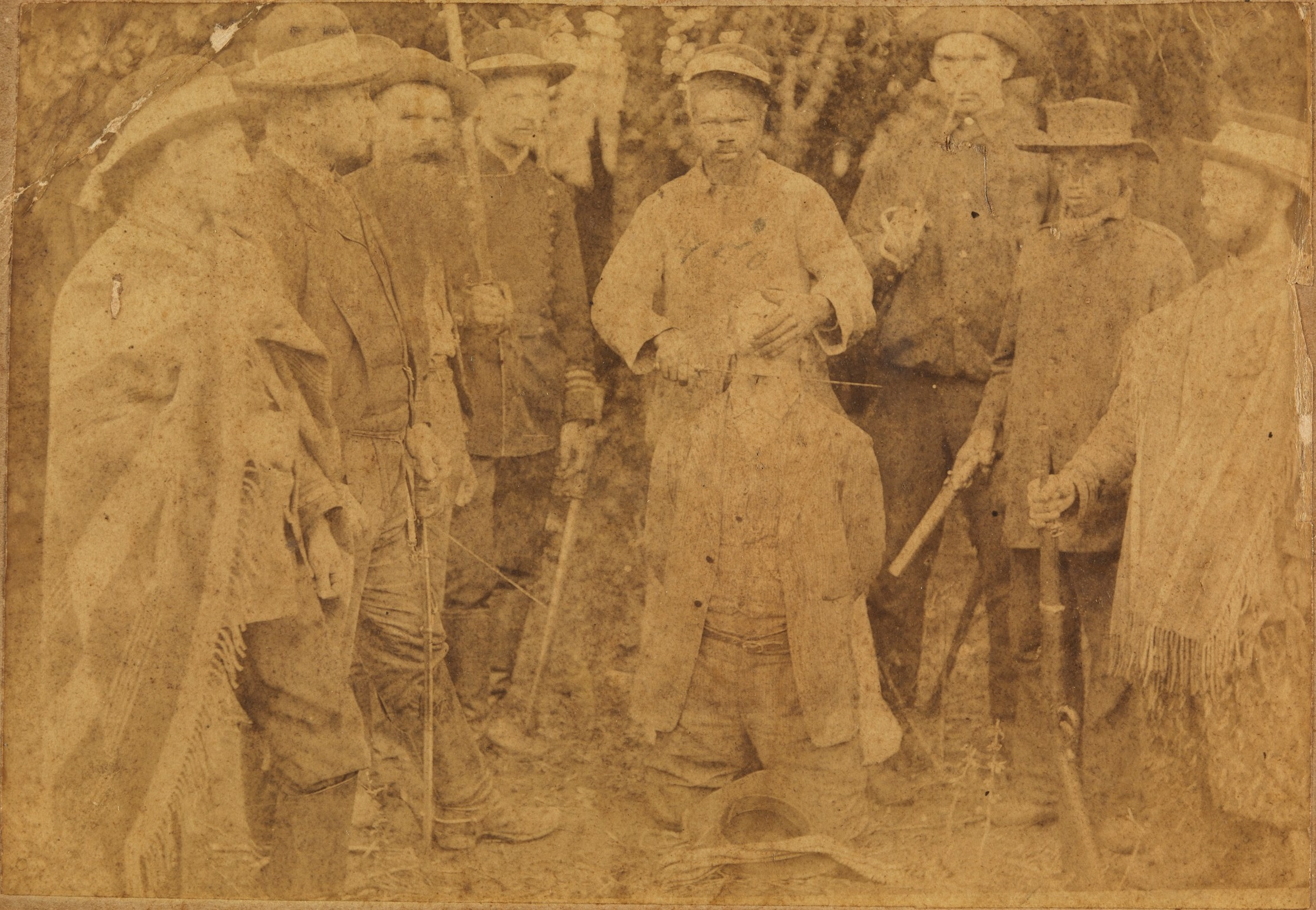
Execution of a federalist by loyalist forces in Ponta Grossa, April 1894.

The Federalist Revolution was likely the bloodiest civil war in independent Brazil's history, leaving circa 10.000 dead and many more wounded and the southern fields and some municipalities ravaged. Many who weren't killed in action were murdered by the victorious in each battle, and especially following the loyalist victory.

After the federalist takeover of Curitiba, they demanded "war loans" not to sack the city. It was during this period that Ildefonso Pereira Correia, the Baron of Serro Azul, devised a plan to rid the city from the Maragatos. He considered fighting in the city unnecessary as it would spill more blood; and so he made the decision to negotiate. In return for peace and the absence of looting, the Baron secretly lent, with the support of some traders, money to Gumercindo Saraiva, head of the Maragatos. The negotiations, however, were seen as betrayal by the defenders of Floriano. Thus, Maragatos left the city in May and Vicente Machado, the deposed governor of Paraná, returned to power. However, the Baron of Serro Azul and five companions were kidnapped. They were taken by train towards Paranaguá, under the pretext that they would board a ship headed towards Rio de Janeiro, where they would receive an award, but it was a trap. The Baron of Serro Azul and his allies were unloaded from the train and shot in the Serra do Mar, accused of treason for negotiating with the Maragatos.

Gaspar da Silveira Martins did not take the federalist defeat lightly. With the victory of Júlio de Castilhos and the consequent pacification, he organized a new federalist congress in Porto Alegre. From then on, he began to pay more attention to his life at the Rincón Pereyra ranch, which he owned in Uruguay, having died suddenly, in a hotel room in Montevideo. General Joca Tavares and admiral Custódio de Melo left politics and the military for good; the first retired to his farm in Bagé, where he died in 1906 at the advanced age of 87, while the admiral died in Rio de Janeiro in 1902 at the age of 61. Following the death of Gumercindo Saraiva, his brother Aparício Saraiva returned to Uruguay where he became the leader of the Blanco Party and led a civil war against the ruling Colorado Party.

In Rio de Janeiro, the presidential republic was consolidated and had its first civil government with the indirect election of Prudente de Morais, replacing the dictatorial Floriano Peixoto, who withdrew from public life. Ideas of parliamentarism were abandoned, and this was the last major conflict for the restoration of the monarchy (although there were others until 1902), with monarchism being abandoned.

== Foreign involvement ==
Throughout the revolution, the maragatos had constant support in Corrientes Province, Argentina, and also from the National Party of Uruguay, opposition to the then ruling Colorado Party, historically an ally of the Brazilian government. That allowed the federalists to smuggle weapons across the border, to practice tactical raids on foreign territory to escape persecution, and to take refuge in neighboring countries at times of disadvantage against the enemy.

In the federal capital of Rio de Janeiro, the Navy Rebels, aligned with the federalists, faced a direct foreign intervention when an American fleet headed by Admiral Andrew E. K. Benham, stationed at the Guanabara Bay, engaged in a series of conflicts with the Brazilian rebel ships in what came to be known as the Rio de Janeiro Affair, resulting in a heavily damaged Brazilian ironclad and in lowering the morale of the rebel sailors, whose leader, admiral Saldanha da Gama, offered to surrender his fleet to the Americans, who refused.

In 1894 president Floriano Peixoto broke official diplomatic relations with the Kingdom of Portugal, accusing the Portuguese government of supporting the exiled rebel sailors. Accordingly, since the navy rebels were branded as monarchists, Floriano believed the King of Portugal, Carlos I, of encouraging revolutionary enterprises to restore the monarchy of the House of Braganza in Brazil. Brazil-Portugal relations were only restored in 1895 following the defeat of the federalist and navy revolts.
