= Rio-grandense Republican Party =

Republican Party of Rio Grande do Sul Partido Republicano Rio-grandense
- Founded: February 23, 1882
- Dissolved: 1937
- Headquarters: Porto Alegre
- Ideology: Republicanism; Regionalism; Castilhism; Positivism
- Political position: Centre
- National affiliation: Liberal Alliance (1929–1930)
- Regional affiliation: Gaúcho United Front (1929–1937)

The Republican Party of Rio Grande do Sul (Portuguese: Partido Republicano Rio-grandense, PRR) was a Brazilian political party founded on February 23, 1882. It was dissolved in 1937 due to the Estado Novo.
