= Júlio de Castilhos =

Brazilian journalist and politician

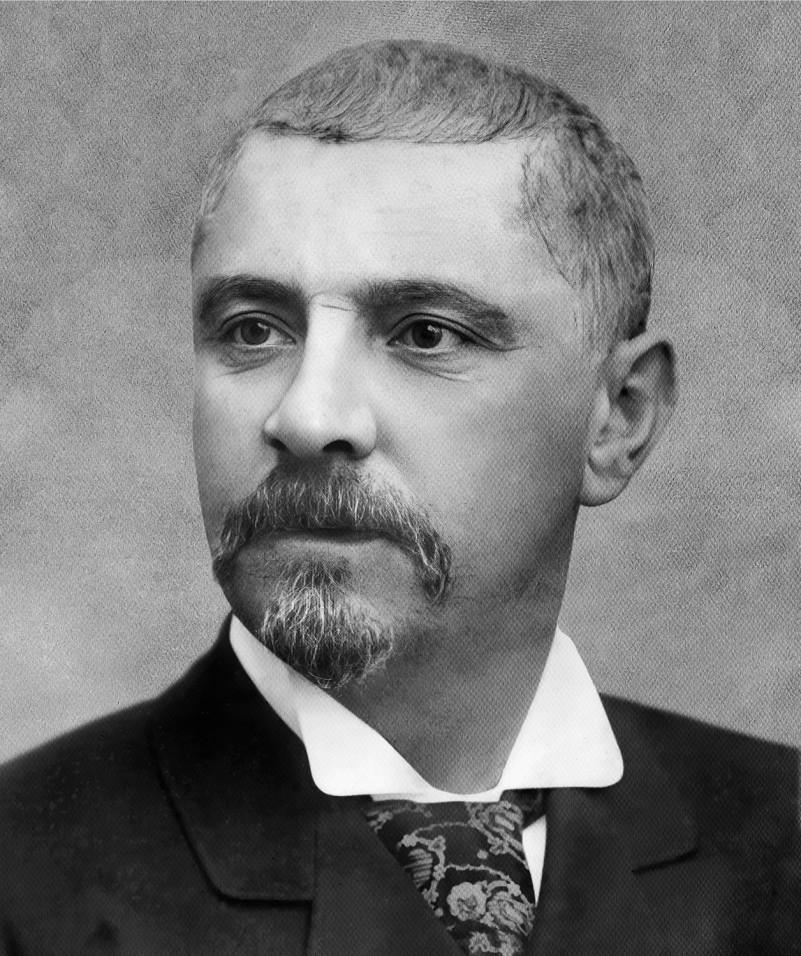

President of Rio Grande do Sul
- In office 25 January 1893 – 25 January 1898
- Preceded by: Fernando Abbott
- Succeeded by: Borges de Medeiros
- In office 15 July 1891 – 12 November 1891
- Preceded by: Fernando Abbott
- Succeeded by: Governing Junta (acting)

Member of the Chamber of Deputies
- In office 15 November 1890 – 14 July 1891
- Constituency: Rio Grande do Sul

Personal details
- Born: 29 June 1860 Cruz Alta, Rio Grande do Sul, Empire of Brazil (now Júlio de Castilhos)
- Died: 24 October 1903 (aged 43) Porto Alegre, Rio Grande do Sul, Brazil
- Party: PRR (1882–1903)
- Spouse: Honorina Martins França da Costa (m. 1883)
- Children: 6
- Parents: Francisco Ferreira Castilhos (father); Carolina de Carvalho Prates (mother)
- Education: Faculty of Law of Largo de São Francisco
- Occupation: Editor-in-chief of A Federação
- Profession: Journalist; politician
- Militia service
- Allegiance: Republicans
- Service years: 1893–1895
- Conflicts: Federalist Revolution

Júlio Prates de Castilhos (29 June 1860 – 24 October 1903) was a Brazilian journalist and politician, having been elected Patriarch of Rio Grande do Sul.

== Politics ==
He was elected twice as the governor of Rio Grande do Sul and was the principal author of the State Constitution of 1891 and a model for many future politicians of the region. He disseminated positivist ideas in Brazil.

On 15 July 1891, Castilhos was elected president of the state of Rio Grande do Sul. However, with the 3 November coup of Deodoro da Fonseca, he was deposed that year. He re-ran for the same office one year later, without adversaries, and regained his old post. Less than a year later, the unsuccessful Federalist Revolution began, with one of the rebel force's demands being his removal from power. His opposers claimed that the State Constitution granted the state governor near-dictatorial powers.

== Castilhism ==
Castilhism was a political theory instituted by Júlio de Castilhos in Rio Grande do Sul, having as characteristics the centralization of powers in the Executive, the institution of mechanisms of direct participation, such as plebiscites and popular referendums; the establishment of a modernizing, interventionist and regulating State of the economy, in addition to its intermediary and moralizing role in society.

== Personal life ==
Castilhos and his wife, Honorina, had six children.

== Death ==
Júlio de Castilhos died prematurely in 1903, a victim of throat cancer.

== Legacy ==
1231 Duque de Caxias, the last house in which he lived was acquired by the state, following the death of his widow in 1905. The house was converted into the Júlio de Castilhos Museum (Museu Júlio de Castilhos) in the centre of Porto Alegre, the oldest museum in Rio Grande do Sul. The politician was also honoured in the capital with the construction of a large monument in the Praça da Matriz (Matriz Square). The Júlio de Castilhos State School in Porto Alegre and the town of Júlio de Castilhos, where he was born, were named in his honour.
