= List of active Brazilian Navy ships =

Naval ensign of Brazil

This is a list of Brazilian Navy ships As of 2026. The Navy has approximately 70 ships in commission or in construction, including 10 major surface combatants, 6 submarines, 1 helicopter carrier, 3 amphibious warfare vessels and 23 OPVs. This list presents only the major combatant and auxiliary vessels in active service and in construction, as the Navy also operates dozens of diverse vessels including for inshore and fast interdiction duties, while accumulating coastguard and river guard roles.

== Submarine fleet ==
Class	Quantity	Origin	Picture	Builder	Boats	No.	Launched	Displacement
Attack submarines (6)
Riachuelo	4	Brazil; France		ICN	Riachuelo	S40	2018	1,900 tonnes
Riachuelo	4	Brazil; France		ICN	Humaitá	S41	2020	1,900 tonnes
Riachuelo	4	Brazil; France		ICN	Tonelero	S42	2024	1,900 tonnes
Riachuelo	4	Brazil; France		ICN	Almirante Karam (Note: Sea trials)	S43	2025	1,900 tonnes
Tupi Type 209	2	Brazil; Germany		HDW	Tupi	S30	1987	1,440 tonnes
Tupi Type 209	2	Brazil; Germany		AMRJ	Tikuna	S34	2005	1,580 tonnes

== Surface fleet ==
Class	Quantity	Origin	Picture	Builder	Boats	No.	Launched	Displacement
Helicopter carrier (1)
—	1	United Kingdom		VSEL	Atlântico (Note: Flagship)	A140	1995	21,500 tonnes
Major surface combatants (10)
Tamandaré	3	Brazil; Germany		TKMS	Tamandaré	F200	2024	3,500 tonnes
Tamandaré	3	Brazil; Germany		TKMS	Jerônimo de Albuquerque (Note: Sea trials)	F201	2025	3,500 tonnes
Tamandaré	3	Brazil; Germany		TKMS	Cunha Moreira (Note: Fitting out)	F202	2026	3,500 tonnes
Niterói Type 21	5	Brazil; United Kingdom		VT	Defensora	F41	1975	3,355 tonnes
Niterói Type 21	5	Brazil; United Kingdom		VT	Constituição	F42	1976	3,355 tonnes
Niterói Type 21	5	Brazil; United Kingdom		VT	Liberal	F43	1977	3,355 tonnes
Niterói Type 21	5	Brazil; United Kingdom		AMRJ	Independência	F44	1974	3,355 tonnes
Niterói Type 21	5	Brazil; United Kingdom		AMRJ	União	F45	1975	3,355 tonnes
Broadsword Type 22	1	United Kingdom		YSL	Rademaker	F49	1977	4,450 tonnes
Inhaúma	1	Brazil		AMRJ	Barroso	V34	2002	2,500 tonnes
Amphibious warfare vessels (3)
Albion	1	United Kingdom		BAE Systems Marine	Oiapoque	G350	2001	19,560 tonnes
Foudre	1	France		DCNS	Bahia	G40	1996	12,000 tonnes
Round Table	1	United Kingdom		Hawthorn Leslie	Almirante Sabóia	G25	1966	7,700 tonnes
Offshore patrol vessels (23)
Amazonas	3	United Kingdom		BAE Systems Marine	Amazonas	P120	2009	2,200 tonnes
Amazonas	3	United Kingdom		BAE Systems Marine	Apa	P121	2010	2,200 tonnes
Amazonas	3	United Kingdom		BAE Systems Marine	Araguari	P122	2010	2,200 tonnes
Macaé	4	Brazil		INACE	Macaé	P70	2009	500 tonnes
Macaé	4	Brazil		INACE	Macau	P71	2010	500 tonnes
Macaé	4	Brazil		EISA/AMRJ (Note: The construction of Maracanã and Mangaratiba was begun by Estaleiro Ilha (EISA), but following the shipyard's bankruptcy in 2015, it was halted and the hulls had to be transported to AMRJ for completion)	Maracanã	P72	2017	500 tonnes
Macaé	4	Brazil		EISA/AMRJ	Mangaratiba	P73	2026	500 tonnes
Bracuí	4	United Kingdom		Richards Dry Dock	Bracuí	P60	1985	864 tonnes
Bracuí	4	United Kingdom		Richards Dry Dock	Benevente	P61	1985	864 tonnes
Bracuí	4	United Kingdom		Richards Dry Dock	Bocaína	P62	1985	864 tonnes
Bracuí	4	United Kingdom		Richards Dry Dock	Babitonga	P63	1986	864 tonnes
Grajaú	12	Brazil		AMRJ	Grajaú	P40	1993	200 tonnes
Grajaú	12	Brazil		AMRJ	Guaíba	P41	1993	200 tonnes
Grajaú	12	Brazil		Mauá	Graúna	P42	1993	200 tonnes
Grajaú	12	Brazil		Mauá	Goiana	P43	1994	200 tonnes
Grajaú	12	Brazil		Peene-Werft	Guajará	P44	1994	200 tonnes
Grajaú	12	Brazil		Peene-Werft	Guaporé	P45	1995	200 tonnes
Grajaú	12	Brazil		Peene-Werft	Gurupá	P46	1995	200 tonnes
Grajaú	12	Brazil		Peene-Werft	Gurupi	P47	1995	200 tonnes
Grajaú	12	Brazil		INACE	Guanabara	P48	1997	200 tonnes
Grajaú	12	Brazil		INACE	Guarujá	P49	1998	200 tonnes
Grajaú	12	Brazil		Peene-Werft	Guaratuba	P50	1999	200 tonnes
Grajaú	12	Brazil		Peene-Werft	Gravataí	P51	1999	200 tonnes
River patrol vessels (10)
Piratini	5	Brazil; United States		AMRJ	Piratini	P10	1970	146 tonnes
Piratini	5	Brazil; United States		AMRJ	Pirajá	P11	1970	146 tonnes
Piratini	5	Brazil; United States		AMRJ	Pampeiro	P12	1970	146 tonnes
Piratini	5	Brazil; United States		AMRJ	Penedo	P14	1970	146 tonnes
Piratini	5	Brazil; United States		AMRJ	Poti	P15	1971	146 tonnes
Pedro Teixeira	2	Brazil		AMRJ	Pedro Teixeira	P20	1972	965 tonnes
Pedro Teixeira	2	Brazil		AMRJ	Raposo Tavares	P21	1972	965 tonnes
Roraima	3	Brazil		MacLaren Shipyard	Roraima	P30	1972	365 tonnes
Roraima	3	Brazil		MacLaren Shipyard	Rondônia	P31	1972	365 tonnes
Roraima	3	Brazil		MacLaren Shipyard	Amapá	P32	1974	365 tonnes
Monitor (1)
—	1	Brazil		AMRJ	Parnaíba	U17	1937	720 tonnes
Mine warfare vessels (3)
Amorim do Valle	1	United Kingdom		Richards Dry Dock	Amorim do Valle	M210	1995	904 tonnes
Aratu	2	Germany		A&R	Atalaia	M17	1971	245 tonnes
Aratu	2	Germany		A&R	Araçatuba	M18	1971	245 tonnes

== Auxiliary fleet ==
Class	Quantity	Origin	Picture	Builder	Boats	No.	Launched	Displacement
Replenishment oiler (1)
—	1	Brazil		Ishibrás	Almirante Gastão Motta	G23	1990	6,000 tonnes
Submarine rescue vessel (1)
—	1	Spain		Astilleros Balenciaga	Guillobel	K120	2009	5,700 tonnes
Icebreakers (2)
—	1	United States		Todd Pacific Shipyards	Almirante Maximiano	H41	1974	3,865 tonnes
—	1	Norway		Eide Marine Services	Ary Rongel	H44	1980	1,982 tonnes
Research vessels (6)
—	1	China		Guangzhou Hantong Shipbuilding	Vital de Oliveira	H39	2014	4,200 tonnes
—	1	Norway		Eiken Mekaniske Verksted	Cruzeiro do Sul	H38	1986	2,100 tonnes
—	1	Norway		Mjellem & Karlsen	Antares	H40	1983	1,248 tonnes
—	1	Brazil; Japan		IHI	Sirius	H21	1957	1,463 tonnes
Amorim do Valle	1	United Kingdom		Richards Dry Dock	Taurus	H36	1985	770 tonnes
—	1	Yugoslavia		Brodosplit	Aspirante Moura	H11	1987	380 tonnes
Training vessels (5)
Niterói	1	Brazil		AMRJ	Brasil	U27	1983	3,355 tonnes
—	1	Netherlands		Damen	Cisne Branco	U20	1999	1,038 tonnes
Aspirante Nascimento	3	Brazil		EMBRASA	Aspirante Nascimento	U10	1980	190 tonnes
Aspirante Nascimento	3	Brazil		EMBRASA	Guarda-Marinha Jansen	U11	1981	190 tonnes
Aspirante Nascimento	3	Brazil		EMBRASA	Guarda-Marinha Brito	U12	1981	190 tonnes
Tugboats (6)
Mearim	3	India		ABG Shipyard	Mearim	G150	2018	1,943 tonnes
Mearim	3	India		ABG Shipyard	Iguatemi	G151	2018	1,943 tonnes
Mearim	3	India		ABG Shipyard	Purus	G152	2018	1,943 tonnes
Triunfo	3	Brazil		ESTANAVE	Tritão	R21	1979	1,350 tonnes
Triunfo	3	Brazil		ESTANAVE	Triunfo	R23	1979	1,350 tonnes
Imperial Marinheiro	1	Netherlands		Bodewes Scheepswerf	Caboclo	V19	1954	1,025 tonnes
—	1	Brazil		INACE	Almirante Hess	U30	1983	90 tonnes

== See also ==
- List of historical ships of the Brazilian Navy
- List of future ships of the Brazilian Navy
