= Brazilian frigate Mariz e Barros =

Multi-purpose frigate of the Brazilian Navy

History

Brazil
- Name: Mariz e Barros
- Namesake: Antônio Carlos de Mariz e Barros
- Ordered: 6 March 2020
- Builder: TKMS, Itajaí
- Cost: $550 million (2023 est.)
- Laid down: 13 August 2026
- Identification: F203
- Status: Under construction

General characteristics
- Class & type: Tamandaré-class frigate
- Displacement: 3.500 t (3.445 long tons)
- Length: 107.2 m (351 ft 8 in)
- Beam: 16 m (52 ft 6 in)
- Draught: 5.2 m (17 ft 1 in)
- Installed power: 4 × Caterpillar C32 diesel generators 1,417 kW each
- Propulsion: CODAD; 4 × MAN V12 28/33D 5,460 kW (7,320 hp) each; 2 × propeller shafts, 5-bladed controllable pitch propellers; Total output: 21,280 kW (28,540 shp)
- Speed: Maximum: 25.5 knots (47.2 km/h; 29.3 mph); Economy: 14 knots (26 km/h; 16 mph)
- Range: 5,500 nmi (10,200 km; 6,300 mi)
- Boats & landing craft carried: 2 × RHIBs
- Complement: c. 130
- Sensors & processing systems: Atlas ANCS combat management system; Hensoldt TRS-4D AESA C-band multi-function radar; Anschütz NSX X-band navigation radar; Atlas ASO 713 hull-mounted sonar; Thales STIR 1.2 EO fire control radar; Safran PASEO XLR electro-optical system; Identification Friend or Foe system; SATCOM system
- Electronic warfare & decoys: Omnisys MAGE Defensor ESM system; Terma C-Guard decoy launching system
- Armament: 1 × Oto Melara 76 mm Super Rapid gun; 1 × Rheinmetall Sea Snake 30 mm CIWS; 2 × FN Herstal Sea Defender 12.7 mm RWS; 2 × twin missile canisters for up to 8 MANSUP anti-ship missiles; 1 × 12-cell VLS for 12 Sea Ceptor surface-to-air missiles; 2 × triple torpedo tubes for Mark 54 torpedoes
- Aircraft carried: 1 S-70B Seahawk (Note: Armed with Penguin anti-ship missiles, or Mark 54 anti-submarine torpedoes) or H225M (Note: Armed with Exocet anti-ship missiles) helicopter; 1 Unmanned Air Systems: Boeing Insitu ScanEagle
- Notes: Sources:

Mariz e Barros (F203) will be the fourth Tamandaré-class stealth frigate for the Brazilian Navy.

== History ==
Mariz e Barros is part of a program that was created in 2017 with the main purpose of replacing the Niterói-class frigates in operation since 1975 and the Type 22s acquired second-hand from the UK in the 1990s.
