= Brazilian frigate Jerônimo de Albuquerque =

Multi-purpose frigate of the Brazilian Navy

- Jerônimo de Albuquerque (to the left) with Tamandaré

History

Brazil
- Name: Jerônimo de Albuquerque
- Namesake: Jerônimo de Albuquerque Maranhão
- Ordered: 6 March 2020
- Builder: TKMS, Itajaí
- Cost: $550 million (2023 est.)
- Laid down: 6 June 2024
- Launched: 8 August 2025
- Sponsored by: Maria Lúcia Guimarães Ribeiro Alckmin
- Identification: F201
- Status: Sea trials

General characteristics
- Class & type: Tamandaré-class frigate
- Displacement: 3.500 t (3.445 long tons)
- Length: 107.2 m (351 ft 8 in)
- Beam: 16 m (52 ft 6 in)
- Draught: 5.2 m (17 ft 1 in)
- Installed power: 4 × Caterpillar C32 diesel generators 1,417 kW each
- Propulsion: CODAD; 4 × MAN V12 28/33D 5,460 kW (7,320 hp) each; 2 × propeller shafts, 5-bladed controllable pitch propellers; Total output: 21,280 kW (28,540 shp)
- Speed: Maximum: 25.5 knots (47.2 km/h; 29.3 mph); Economy: 14 knots (26 km/h; 16 mph)
- Range: 5,500 nmi (10,200 km; 6,300 mi)
- Boats & landing craft carried: 2 × RHIBs
- Complement: c. 130
- Sensors & processing systems: Atlas ANCS combat management system; Hensoldt TRS-4D AESA C-band multi-function radar; Anschütz NSX X-band navigation radar; Atlas ASO 713 hull-mounted sonar; Thales STIR 1.2 EO fire control radar; Safran PASEO XLR electro-optical system; Identification Friend or Foe system; SATCOM system
- Electronic warfare & decoys: Omnisys MAGE Defensor ESM system; Terma C-Guard decoy launching system
- Armament: 1 × Oto Melara 76 mm Super Rapid gun; 1 × Rheinmetall Sea Snake 30 mm CIWS; 2 × FN Herstal Sea Defender 12.7 mm RWS; 2 × twin missile canisters for up to 8 MANSUP anti-ship missiles; 1 × 12-cell VLS for 12 Sea Ceptor surface-to-air missiles; 2 × triple torpedo tubes for Mark 54 torpedoes
- Aircraft carried: 1 S-70B Seahawk (Note: Armed with Penguin anti-ship missiles, or Mark 54 anti-submarine torpedoes) or H225M (Note: Armed with Exocet anti-ship missiles) helicopter; 1 Unmanned Air Systems: Boeing Insitu ScanEagle
- Notes: Sources:

Jerônimo de Albuquerque (F201) is a Tamandaré-class stealth frigate under construction for the Brazilian Navy.

== History ==
Jerônimo de Albuquerque is part of a program that was created in 2017 with the main purpose of replacing the Niterói-class frigates in operation since 1975 and the Type 22s acquired second-hand from the UK in the 1990s.

The final configuration of armaments and sensors was announced on 10 June 2021. The boat is under construction by the Águas Azuis consortium composed by ThyssenKrupp Marine Systems, Embraer Defense & Security and the Ministry of Defence, at the Brazilian city of Itajaí with the first steel cut on 1 November 2023.

The vessel was launched on 8 August 2025 by Lady Maria Lúcia Guimarães Ribeiro Alckmin, wife of Vice President Geraldo Alckmin.
