= Brazilian cruiser Almirante Tamandaré =

Two cruisers in the Brazilian Navy have been named Almirante Tamandaré:

- Brazilian cruiser Almirante Tamandaré (1890), launched in 1890 and stricken in 1920
- Brazilian cruiser Almirante Tamandaré (C12), launched in 1938 as USS St. Louis, acquired by Brazil in 1951 and stricken in 1976

== See also ==
- Almirante Tamandaré (disambiguation)
- Brazilian ship Tamandaré
