= Torpedo Pesado Nacional =

Brazilian heavyweight torpedo

Torpedo Pesado Nacional — TPNer
- Type: Heavyweight antisubmarine torpedo
- Place of origin: Brazil

Production history
- Designed: 2015 (under development)
- Manufacturer: Mectron

Specifications
- Diameter: 533 mm
- Engine: Two-speed, reciprocating external combustion
- Guidance system: Active or passive/active acoustic homing

Torpedo Pesado Nacional (English: National Heavyweight Torpedo) TPNer also known as TP-1, is a Brazilian heavyweight anti-submarine warfare torpedo under development by the Brazilian defense company Mectron S.A. and the Brazilian Navy.

== Development ==
The project of the first Brazilian national torpedo was conceived in 2015 by Mectron, a subsidiary of the Brazilian conglomerate Novonor, together with the anti-ship missile Mansup AV-RE40, aiming to meet the strategic needs of the Brazilian Armed Forces modernization program. The Navy intends to use the TPNer as the armament of the Scorpéne-class SSKs and Álvaro Alberto-class SSNs.

As of 2018 no further information on the project had been released since 2015.

== See also ==
- List of torpedoes
- F21 Artemis a French heavyweight torpedo
- Mark 48 an American heavyweight torpedo
- Stingray a British lightweight torpedo
