= Brazilian frigate Tamandaré =

Multi-purpose frigate of the Brazilian Navy

- Tamandaré

History

Brazil
- Name: Tamandaré
- Namesake: Marquis of Tamandaré
- Ordered: 6 March 2020
- Builder: TKMS, Itajaí
- Cost: $550 million (2023 est.)
- Laid down: 24 March 2023
- Launched: 9 August 2024
- Sponsored by: Vera Brennand
- Completed: 6 March 2026
- Commissioned: 24 April 2026
- Identification: MMSI number: 710515000; Callsign: PWTD; Pennant number: F200
- Status: Active
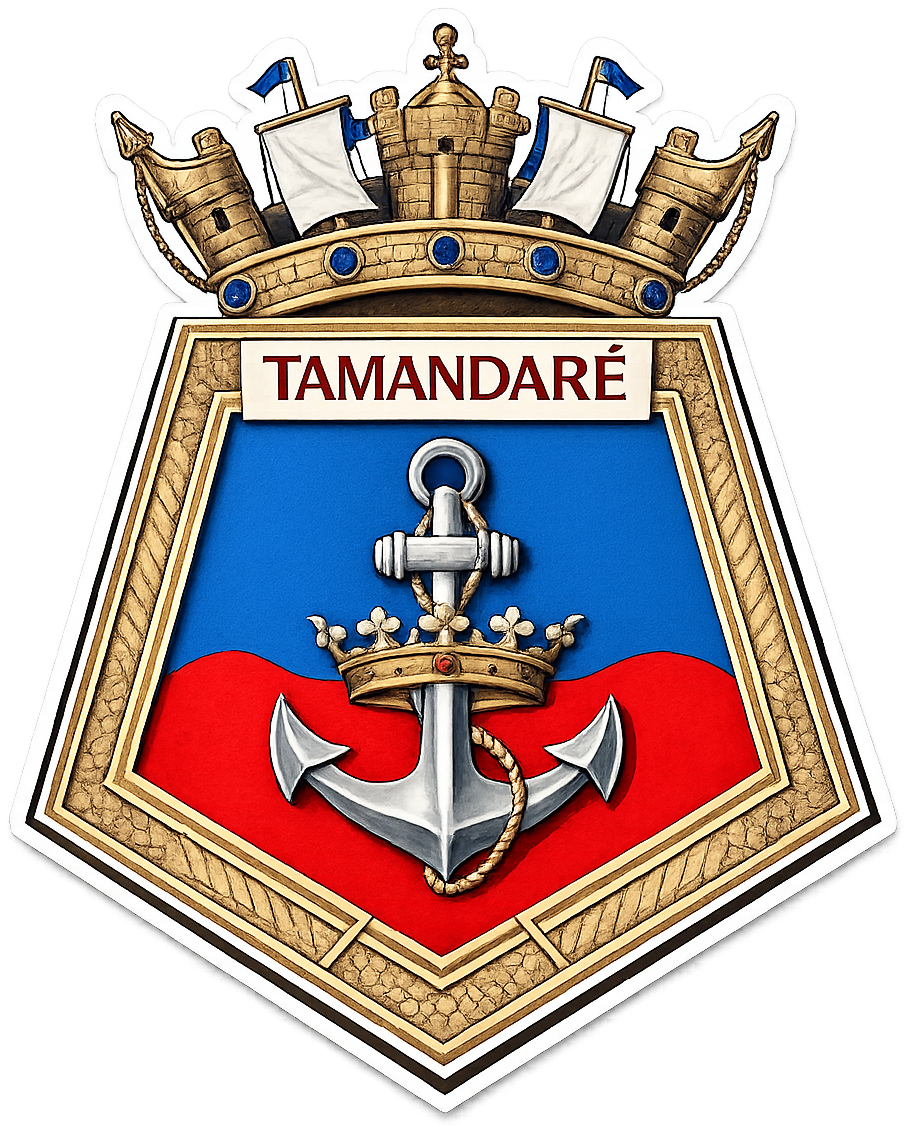
- Badge

General characteristics
- Class & type: Tamandaré-class frigate
- Displacement: 3.500 t (3.445 long tons)
- Length: 107.2 m (351 ft 8 in)
- Beam: 16 m (52 ft 6 in)
- Draught: 5.2 m (17 ft 1 in)
- Installed power: 4 × Caterpillar C32 diesel generators 1,417 kW each
- Propulsion: CODAD; 4 × MAN V12 28/33D 5,460 kW (7,320 hp) each; 2 × propeller shafts, 5-bladed controllable pitch propellers; Total output: 21,280 kW (28,540 shp)
- Speed: Maximum: 25.5 knots (47.2 km/h; 29.3 mph); Economy: 14 knots (26 km/h; 16 mph)
- Range: 5,500 nmi (10,200 km; 6,300 mi)
- Boats & landing craft carried: 2 × RHIBs
- Complement: c. 130
- Sensors & processing systems: Atlas ANCS combat management system; Hensoldt TRS-4D AESA C-band multi-function radar; Anschütz NSX X-band navigation radar; Atlas ASO 713 hull-mounted sonar; Thales STIR 1.2 EO fire control radar; Safran PASEO XLR electro-optical system; Identification Friend or Foe system; SATCOM system
- Electronic warfare & decoys: Omnisys MAGE Defensor ESM system; Terma C-Guard decoy launching system
- Armament: 1 × Oto Melara 76 mm Super Rapid gun; 1 × Rheinmetall Sea Snake 30 mm CIWS; 2 × FN Herstal Sea Defender 12.7 mm RWS; 2 × twin missile canisters for up to 8 MANSUP anti-ship missiles; 1 × 12-cell VLS for 12 Sea Ceptor surface-to-air missiles; 2 × triple torpedo tubes for Mark 54 torpedoes
- Aircraft carried: 1 S-70B Seahawk (Note: Armed with Penguin anti-ship missiles, or Mark 54 anti-submarine torpedoes) or H225M (Note: Armed with Exocet anti-ship missiles) helicopter; 1 Unmanned Air Systems: Boeing Insitu ScanEagle
- Notes: Sources:

Tamandaré (F200) is the lead ship of the Tamandaré-class stealth frigates for the Brazilian Navy.

== History ==
The program was created in 2017 with the main purpose of replacing the Niterói-class frigates in operation since 1975 and the Type 22s acquired second-hand from the UK in the 1990s.

The final configuration of armaments and sensors was announced on 10 June 2021. The boat is under construction by the Águas Azuis consortium composed by ThyssenKrupp Marine Systems, Embraer Defense & Security and the Ministry of Defence, at the Brazilian city of Itajaí since 24 March 2023.

The vessel was launched on 9 August 2024 by Lady Vera Brennand, wife of Defense Minister José Múcio. It is the fourth vessel in the Brazilian Navy's history to be named after Admiral Joaquim Marques Lisboa, the Marquis of Tamandaré.
