= Kale KTJ-3200 =

Turbofan engine for cruise missiles

- Type: Turbojet
- National origin: Turkey
- Manufacturer: Kale Group
- First run: 2020s
- Major applications: SOM; Atmaca
- Developed into: Kale KTJ-3700

Kale KTJ-3200 is a small, expendable turbojet engine developed for use in cruise missiles by Kale Group. Kale KTJ-3200 jet engines are currently used in the SOM cruise missile and the Atmaca anti-ship missile. It is the first turbojet engine developed in Turkey. The engine was produced entirely domestically and without any ITAR restrictions.

== Design and development ==
KTJ-3200 engine has begun to be developed to replace the French Microturbo TRI-40 jet engines used in the SOM missiles developed by Tübitak Sage. The first test was conducted in 2018. The process was accelerated after France created difficulties in the sale of jet engines to Turkey. The first batch of KTJ-3200 engines was delivered to Roketsan on 21 November 2020. It was announced that the first mass production KTJ-3200 engines were delivered to Roketsan in the first quarter of 2022. On 10 March 2024, the KTJ-3200 engine was installed on the Atmaca missile and the first test launch was successfully made. On 4 April 2025, a contract was signed between Kale Group and the Brazilian company SIATT for the use of KTJ-3200 in MANSUP anti-ship missiles.

== Specifications (KTJ-3200) ==
Data from

==== General characteristics ====
- Type: single-spool turbojet
- Length: 630 mm (24.8 in)
- Diameter: 330 mm (13 in)
- Dry weight: 50 kg (110.2 lb)

==== Components ====
- Compressor:
- Turbine: single-stage
- Fuel type: Jet A-1, JP-8, JP-10 (fuel)

==== Performance ====
- Maximum thrust: 3.2 kN (719.4 lbf)
- Specific fuel consumption: 1.18 kg/h/daN (1.16 lb/lbf/h)
