= Brazilian ship Tamandaré =

Four ships of the Brazilian Navy have been named Tamandaré:

- Brazilian ironclad Tamandaré, launched in 1865 and stricken in 1879
- Brazilian cruiser Almirante Tamandaré (1890), launched in 1890 and stricken in 1920
- Brazilian cruiser Almirante Tamandaré (C12), launched in 1938 as USS St. Louis, acquired by Brazil in 1951 and stricken in 1976
- Brazilian frigate Tamandaré, a Tamandaré-class frigate
