= Caterpillar C27 =

Overview
- Manufacturer: Caterpillar Incorporated
- Production: 1983–2004 (as 3412); 2000- (as C27)

Layout
- Configuration: Four-stroke V12
- Displacement: 27 L (1,648 cu in)
- Cylinder bore: 137 mm (5.4 in)
- Piston stroke: 154 mm (6.1 in)
- Compression ratio: 16:1

RPM range
- Idle speed: 545
- Max. engine speed: 2100

Combustion
- Turbocharger: Double
- Fuel system: Unit injection (see management)
- Management: Electronic (ACERT) with mechanical failsafe
- Fuel type: Diesel
- Oil system: Wet sump
- Cooling system: Water cooled

Output
- Power output: 783 kW (1,050 hp) @ 2100 rpm (marine/military rating)
- Torque output: 4,798 N⋅m (3,539 lbf⋅ft) @ 1400 rpm

Dimensions
- Dry weight: 3 tonnes (3.0 long tons; 3.3 short tons)

Emissions
- Emissions target standard: Euro V or IMO IV
- Emissions control systems: Exhaust gas recirculation; Selective catalytic reduction

Chronology
- Predecessor: Caterpillar 34 series engine
- Successor: Caterpillar C32

The Caterpillar C27 is a V12 diesel internal combustion engine made by Caterpillar. The engine is 27 litres (1,648 cu in) in displacement. Each cylinder has a bore of 137 mm (5.4 in) and a stroke of 154 mm (6.1 in). The engine can produce 370–750 kW (500–1,000 hp) at 2100 RPM. The peak torque occurs at an engine speed of 1400 RPM. This engine began production as Caterpillar 3412. As emissions controls were tightened, engine management and combustion chamber were redesigned such that two different engines emerged: the mechanically controlled Caterpillar C27 and the electronically controlled Caterpillar C30. The C30 block was later scaled up and the Caterpillar C32 emerged. The C27 also began to be produced with electronic engine control and management after 2007.
