= SOM (missile) =

Turkish air-launched cruise missile

SOM Cruise Missile
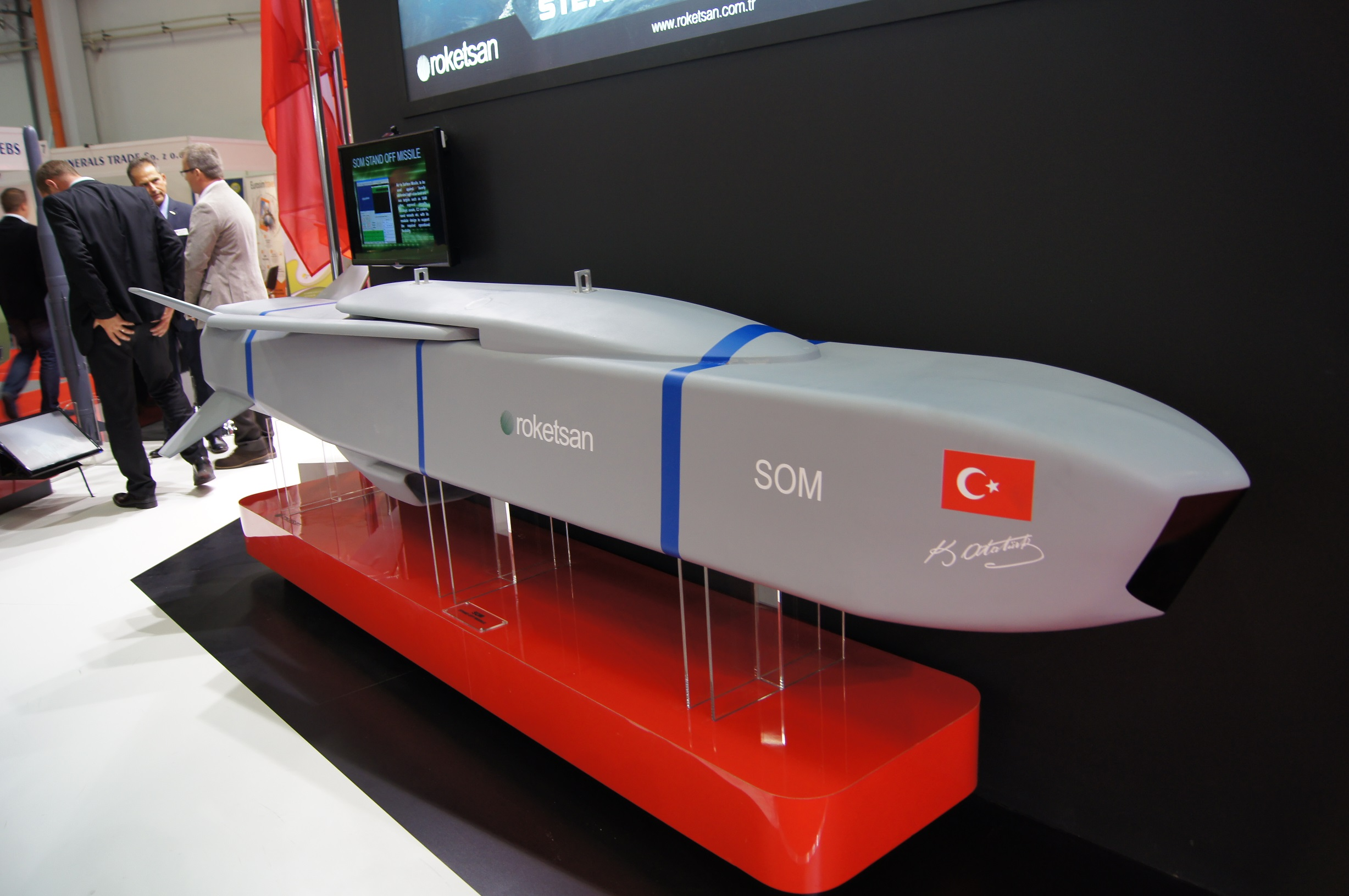
- SOM cruise missile mockup exhibited during MSPO 2017 at Kielce, Poland.
- Type: Air-launched cruise missile Anti-ship missile
- Place of origin: Turkey

Service history
- In service: Since 2017
- Used by: Turkish Air Force

Production history
- Designer: ROKETSAN; TÜBİTAK-SAGE
- Designed: 2006-2017
- Manufacturer: ROKETSAN; SOM-J is manufactured by TÜBİTAK SAGE and ROKETSAN in Turkey.

Specifications
- Mass: SOM-A: 620 kilograms (1,367 lb); SOM-B1: 620 kilograms (1,367 lb); SOM-B2: 660 kilograms (1,455 lb); SOM-J: 500 kilograms (1,102 lb)
- Length: 3,657 millimetres (12.0 ft)
- Wingspan: 2.6 metres (8.53 ft)
- Warhead: 230 kilograms (507 lb); SOM-A: High Explosive Blast-Fragmentation Warhead; SOM-B1: High Explosive Blast-Fragmentation Warhead; SOM-B2: Dual Stage Tandem Penetrating Warhead; SOM-J: Semi-Armor Piercing Warhead
- Engine: Kale KTJ-3200; Microturbo TRI-40(First versions); 2.5-3.3 kN
- Operational range: SOM-A, B1, B2: >250 km (130 nmi); SOM-J: 275 km (148 nmi)
- Flight altitude: Terrain hugging Sea skimming
- Maximum speed: 623 knots (0.94 Mach)
- Guidance system: INS / GPS; Terrain Referenced Navigation; Image Based Navigation; Automatic Target Recognition; Imaging Infrared Seeker
- Accuracy: 5 metres (16 ft) CEP
- Launch platform: F-16 Fighting Falcon; F-4 Phantom II; TAI TF-X; TAI Hürjet; Bayraktar Akıncı; Bayraktar MIUS

The SOM (Turkish: Satha Atılan Orta Menzilli Mühimmat) is a next-generation autonomous, stealth, high precision air-launched cruise missile developed by TÜBİTAK SAGE, Defence Research and Development Institute of Turkey. It was first revealed during the 100th anniversary celebrations of the Turkish Air Force at the Çiğli Air Base in İzmir, on 4 June 2011. Developed since 2006, the SOM is Turkey's first domestic guided missile for striking both stationary and moving targets at a stand-off distance of over 180 kilometers. Although being developed by TÜBİTAK SAGE which still holds authority over the design of the missile, ROKETSAN has been given the role of manufacturing and marketing the missile for export.

== Description ==
The SOM stand-off cruise missile is a family of launch and leave precision strike weapons against both land or sea targets. It uses GPS as its primary mode of guidance complemented by an advanced inertial navigation system and a radar-based Terrain Referenced Navigation system, allowing the missile to skim the terrain during its flight in order to evade local defence systems. According to the developer, it features advanced geometry and aerodynamics over similar missile systems, as well as lightweight composite components that minimize the radar cross-section of the missile. A terminal stage infrared imager detects the individual target by matching its signature with a pre-loaded database of similar targets allowing for precision strike. It can also be used to provide image-based midcourse navigation by taking snapshots of waypoints and comparing them against predicted position to update the navigation system. Thus, if GPS capability is denied or degraded, the missile can follow its waypoints using infrared based terrain updates. The missile includes a two-way datalink that makes possible to change the task in flight. The basic design of the missile includes a fuselage designed specifically to fit in the internal weapons bays of the F-35 Lightning II. It is intended to achieve high accuracy in striking military targets like command and control facilities, SAM sites, parked aircraft and surface ships.

== Development ==
=== Tests ===
According to the TUBITAK-SAGE officials, the initial demonstration flights of the prototypes were completed successfully. The missile made its first guided flight on 9 August 2011 over the Black Sea. Covering more than 100 nautical miles using GPS/INS guidance, the missile successfully hit its target with high accuracy. It was planned to assess the design aspects of the missile by conducting about 30 test flights. The delivery of a first batch of missiles to the Turkish Air Force would take place by the end of 2011, following more complicated live firing tests planned for the rest of the year.

In 2018 SOM successfully hit its target from a 300 km distance. In March 2025, SOM-J was successfully tested against a sea target.

On March 21, 2026, the SOM-J stand-off missile struck a designated target during a live-warhead test, confirming a direct hit under operational conditions.

=== Range ===
While initially the range of the missile was announced to be 100 nmi, debates arose in local press around the missile's real range after Prime Minister Recep Tayyip Erdogan unexpectedly set objectives for the development of a missile with a range of 2,500 km (1,300 nmi) at the plenary session of the High Science and Technology Council on 28 December 2011. Shortly after, head of the Scientific and Technological Research Council of Turkey (TÜBİTAK) Yücel Altınbaşak informed that they set a task to develop the missile to 2,500 km (1,300 nmi) within 2 years. "The SOM missile is currently tested for 300 km (160 nmi) range and successfully achieved 10 m (33 ft) precision goal, demonstrating around 5 m (16 ft) accuracy in live fires. We are planning to start 500 km (270 nmi) range tests this year.

=== Engine ===
The first versions of the missile used French Microturbo TRI-40 turbojet engines. However, after France began to block the sale of the engines for political reasons, a decision was made to develop a local Turkish engine. As of 2022, Kale KTJ-3200 engines began to be used.

== Production ==
On 26 October 2018, Turkey's defence industry authority announced that the missile entered serial production phase with Roketsan.

== Variants ==
TUBITAK-SAGE developed the missile in several configurations, with different warheads and guidance/communication packages:

- SOM-A: inertial/GPS guidance, high-explosive fragmentation warhead.
- SOM-B1: inertial/GPS/imaging infrared guidance, high-explosive fragmentation warhead.
- SOM-B2: inertial/GPS/imaging infrared guidance, tandem-charge warhead for use against hardened targets.
- SOM-C1: inertial/GPS/imaging infrared guidance, high-explosive fragmentation warhead for use against mobile targets. Still in development.
- SOM-C2: inertial/GPS/imaging infrared guidance, tandem-charge warhead for use against hardened mobile targets. Still in development.
- SOM-J: inertial/GPS/imaging infrared guidance, semi armour-piercing warhead for use against ships. Still in development.

SOM-C1, C2 and J variants will feature a data-link for man-in-the-loop update of a waypoint and terminal stage of the missile.

== Foreign partnerships ==
=== F-35 Lightning II ===
On 24 October 2014 Roketsan and Lockheed Martin entered into a teaming agreement whereby the parties would modify, produce and market jointly a new variant of the SOM missile, dubbed SOM-J, for use in the internal carriages of the F-35. The SOM was one of two cruise missiles to be integrated with the F-35, the other being the Joint Strike Missile developed by Kongsberg Defence & Aerospace of Norway and Raytheon.

As of 2019, the status of further integration has been put in doubt following Turkey's expulsion from the F-35 program as a result of its purchase of the Russian S-400 air-defense system.

== Users ==
- Turkey: The SOM missile has been integrated for use on TAI produced Turkish Air Force F-16 Fighting Falcon and Turkish Air Force operated F-4E 2020. Also planned to be used on the Bayraktar Akıncı UCAV. It is estimated that so far, a total of 495+ Stand-Off Missile (SOM) ALCMs have been ordered under two separate contracts (80+415)
- Azerbaijan: Azerbaijani Air Force has bought SOM missiles from the Turkish company of Roketsan. On April 6, 2025, some news sources announced that Azerbaijan received SOM missiles equipped with the domestic Turkish engine Kale KTJ-3200 for the first time and conducted a launch test. Azerbaijan could not purchase SOM missiles produced with French Microturbo TRI-40 jet engines due to the blockade by France.

== See also ==
- AGM-158 JASSM – (United States)
- C-802 – (China)
- Ra'ad (air-launched cruise missile) – (Pakistan)
- HOPE/HOSBO – (Germany)
- Joint Strike Missile – (Norway)
- Taurus KEPD 350 – (Sweden, Germany)
- Saber – (United Arab Emirates)
- Storm Shadow – (France, United Kingdom)
- YJ-12 – (China)
- YJ-22 – (China)
- Kh-69 – (Russia)
- Gezgin cruise missile, Turkey
