= Tamandaré-class frigate =

Brazilian frigate class

- Tamandaré

Class overview
- Name: Tamandaré class
- Builders: TKMS
- Operators: Brazilian Navy
- Preceded by: Niterói class; Broadsword class; Inhaúma class
- Cost: $550 million per boat (for Batch 1, 2023 est.)
- Built: 2022–present
- In commission: 2026–present
- Planned: 9
- Building: 2
- Completed: 2
- Active: 1

General characteristics
- Type: General-purpose frigate
- Displacement: 3.500 t (3.445 long tons)
- Length: 107.2 m (351 ft 8 in)
- Beam: 16 m (52 ft 6 in)
- Draught: 5.2 m (17 ft 1 in)
- Installed power: 4 × Caterpillar C32 diesel generators 1,417 kW each
- Propulsion: CODAD; 4 × MAN V12 28/33D 5,460 kW (7,320 hp) each; 2 × propeller shafts, 5-bladed controllable pitch propellers; Total output: 21,280 kW (28,540 shp)
- Speed: Maximum: 25.5 knots (47.2 km/h; 29.3 mph); Economy: 14 knots (26 km/h; 16 mph)
- Range: 5,500 nmi (10,200 km; 6,300 mi)
- Boats & landing craft carried: 2 × RHIBs
- Complement: c. 130
- Sensors & processing systems: Atlas ANCS combat management system; Hensoldt TRS-4D AESA C-band multi-function radar; Anschütz NSX X-band navigation radar; Atlas ASO 713 hull-mounted sonar; Thales STIR 1.2 EO fire control radar; Safran PASEO XLR electro-optical system; Identification Friend or Foe system; SATCOM system
- Electronic warfare & decoys: Omnisys MAGE Defensor ESM system; Terma C-Guard decoy launching system
- Armament: 1 × Oto Melara 76 mm Super Rapid gun; 1 × Rheinmetall Sea Snake 30 mm CIWS; 2 × FN Herstal Sea Defender 12.7 mm RWS; 2 × twin missile canisters for up to 8 MANSUP anti-ship missiles; 1 × 12-cell VLS for 12 Sea Ceptor surface-to-air missiles; 2 × triple torpedo tubes for Mark 54 torpedoes
- Aircraft carried: 1 S-70B Seahawk (Note: Armed with Penguin anti-ship missiles, or Mark 54 anti-submarine torpedoes) or H225M (Note: Armed with Exocet anti-ship missiles) helicopter; 1 Unmanned Air Systems: Boeing Insitu ScanEagle
- Notes: Sources:

The Tamandaré class is a series of stealth frigates being built for the Brazilian Navy by the German shipyard ThyssenKrupp Marine Systems in association with the defense division of Embraer in the Brazilian city of Itajaí. The class it is based on the Blohm+Voss Mehrzweck-Kombination (MEKO) family of warships and entered in service in 2026.

== History ==
=== Batch 1 ===
The program was created in 2017 with the main purpose of replacing all the current major surface combatants of the Niterói-class frigates in operation since 1975, the Broadsword-class boats acquired second-hand from the United Kingdom in the 1990s, and the Inhaúma-class corvettes. Several companies from seventeen countries entered in the competition opened by the Ministry of Defence, offering different types of projects and offset packages. The list of all participating companies was released on 16 May 2017.

After more than a year of studies by the Directorate of Program Management of the Navy and the Naval Projects Management Company, the short-list of the finalist projects was released in October 2018, the selected projects were: ThyssenKrupp Marine Systems and the MEKO A-100, the Sigma-class of Damen Group, the Gowind-class of Naval Group and Fincantieri with Brazilian Navy's indigenous project variant.

ThyssenKrupp Marine Systems with a 3,500-ton MEKO A-100-class variant was declared winner in March 2019, with the contract for the first batch of four units signed on 6 March 2020. In January 2021, ThyssenKrupp confirmed the acquisition of the Oceana shipyard in Itajaí, becoming the company's first shipyard in Latin America, with the objective of building the new Brazilian frigates. The construction of the lead ship, Tamandaré, started in September 2022 and the launch ceremony of the boat took place in August 2024. As of November 2023, each ship of the first batch cost around $550 million (R$2.77 billion), the total program cost was reported $2.2 billion.

On 3 November 2026, during Euronaval expo in Paris, Andrea Silva Hemerly, executive of Embraer's subsidiary and Águas Azuis consortium company, Atech, reported an ongoing negotiation to a Batch 1 contractual amendment for a ninth frigate, to be built before the boats of the Batch 2.

=== Batch 2 ===
The Brazilian Navy announced plans to build a second batch of four more units in August 2024, confirming the National Maritime Strategy published by the MoD in 2023. On 7 November 2025, was reported that a negotiation for additional ships "would begin in the coming months". In February 2026, the Brazilian Navy confirmed the construction of a second batch of more four boats. On 20 April 2026, the Brazilian President Luiz Inácio Lula da Silva together with German Chancellor Friedrich Merz announced four additional boats, with the German and Brazilian defense ministries signing an agreement on the same day.

On 24 April 2026, the Brazilian Navy signed a MoU (Memorandum of Understanding) with TKMS and Embraer for four more ships with the new contract with an estimated cost around $2 billion (R$10 billion). The Batch 2 ships may be equipped with a 200 km extended range variant of national built MANSUP anti-ship missile, and the Strales system with DART guided ammunition within the Oto Melara 76 mm main gun.

== Design ==
The class was based on the MEKO family of warships, a concept of modern naval shipbuilding based on modularity of armament, electronics and other equipment, aiming at ease of maintenance and cost reduction. Designed as multi-mission vessels, the class is able to fulfill the anti-aircraft warfare role with Sea Ceptor surface-to-air missiles, anti-surface warfare with the Brazilian MANSUP missiles, and anti-submarine warfare. The class was developed with the two island philosophy.

Tamandaré is equipped with the Hensoldt TRS-4D active electronically scanned array radar, able to track 1,000 targets at a range of up to 250 km (160 mi). The combat management system (CMS) and the integrated platform management system (IPMS), designed by Atech, a subsidiary of Embraer, are a version derived from the Atlas ANCS and L3 Mapps, exclusively designed to meet the Brazilian requirements.

Rheinmetall, a German defense company, is responsible for the supply of its new close-in weapon system, Sea Snake, armed with a 30 mm revolver cannon with ABM (air burst ammunition) capability. The MAGE Defensor suite responsible for the electronic warfare support measures (ESM), electronic countermeasure (ECM) and the electronic signals intelligence (ELINT) systems of the class, was developed by the Brazilian company Omnisys. The class is fitted for, but not equipped with land-attack cruise missiles. The ships are equipped with the Anschütz SYNAPSIS Integrated Navigation and Bridge System (INBS).

=== Participation of Brazilian companies ===
Like other major defense programs in the country, the government demanded the construction of the ships in Brazil, the participation of Brazilian companies in the industrial process and the transfer of technologies. Embraer, along its subsidiary Atech, are responsible for the integration of systems and sensors of the class, other companies like Akaer which is involved in the industrial process, building and nationalizing components and parts, and Usiminas supplying the steel, are responsible for the reduction of costs and foreign dependence. The ammunition for the Oto Melara 76 mm naval gun will be produced domestically, including the VULCANO variant. Around 40% of each ship's parts are produced in the country.

== Operational history ==
The class saw its first international deployment during the Fraterno XXXIX annual exercise with the Argentine Navy in August 2026, with the Argentine frigate La Argentina (D-11) and corvettes Espora (P-41) and Rosales (P-42). The other Brazilian means included the submarine Humaitá (S41).

== Ships ==
No.	Name	Builder	Status	Contract	Laid down	Launched	Comm.	Batch	Notes
Brazilian Navy Tamandaré class (4 ordered + 5 planned)
F200	Tamandaré	TKMS, Itajaí, Brazil	Active	6 Mar 2020	24 Mar 2023	9 Aug 2024	24 Apr 2026	Batch 1	
F201	Jerônimo de Albuquerque	TKMS, Itajaí, Brazil	Sea trials	6 Mar 2020	6 Jun 2024	8 Aug 2025	2027	Batch 1	
F202	Cunha Moreira	TKMS, Itajaí, Brazil	Fitting out	6 Mar 2020	5 Jun 2025	26 Jun 2026	2028	Batch 1	
F203	Mariz e Barros	TKMS, Itajaí, Brazil	Under construction	6 Mar 2020	13 Aug 2026	Nov 2027	2029	Batch 1	
TBA	Marcílio Dias	TKMS, Itajaí, Brazil	Planned	expected 2026	–	–	–	Batch 1	Ninth boat negotiation as of Nov 2026
F204	TBA	TKMS, Itajaí, Brazil	Planned	TBA	–	–	–	Batch 2	Batch 2 negotiation as of Apr 2026
F205	TBA	TKMS, Itajaí, Brazil	Planned	TBA	–	–	–	Batch 2	Batch 2 negotiation as of Apr 2026
F206	TBA	TKMS, Itajaí, Brazil	Planned	TBA	–	–	–	Batch 2	Batch 2 negotiation as of Apr 2026
F207	TBA	TKMS, Itajaí, Brazil	Planned	TBA	–	–	–	Batch 2	Batch 2 negotiation as of Apr 2026

== Gallery ==
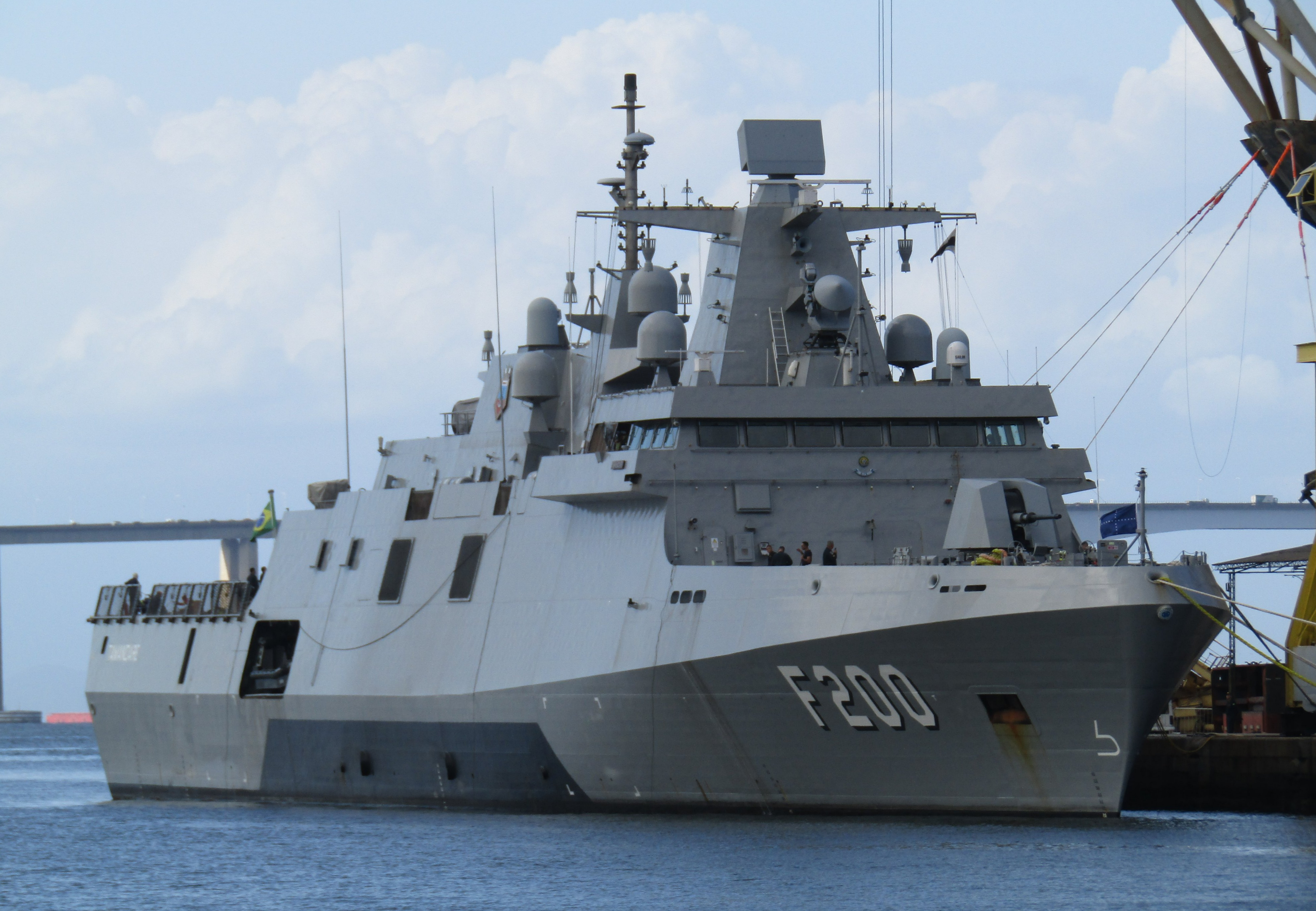
Tamandaré docked at the Rio de Janeiro Navy Arsenal

Tamandaré operating with Jerônimo de Albuquerque

Tamandaré operating with a Super Lynx Mk.21B

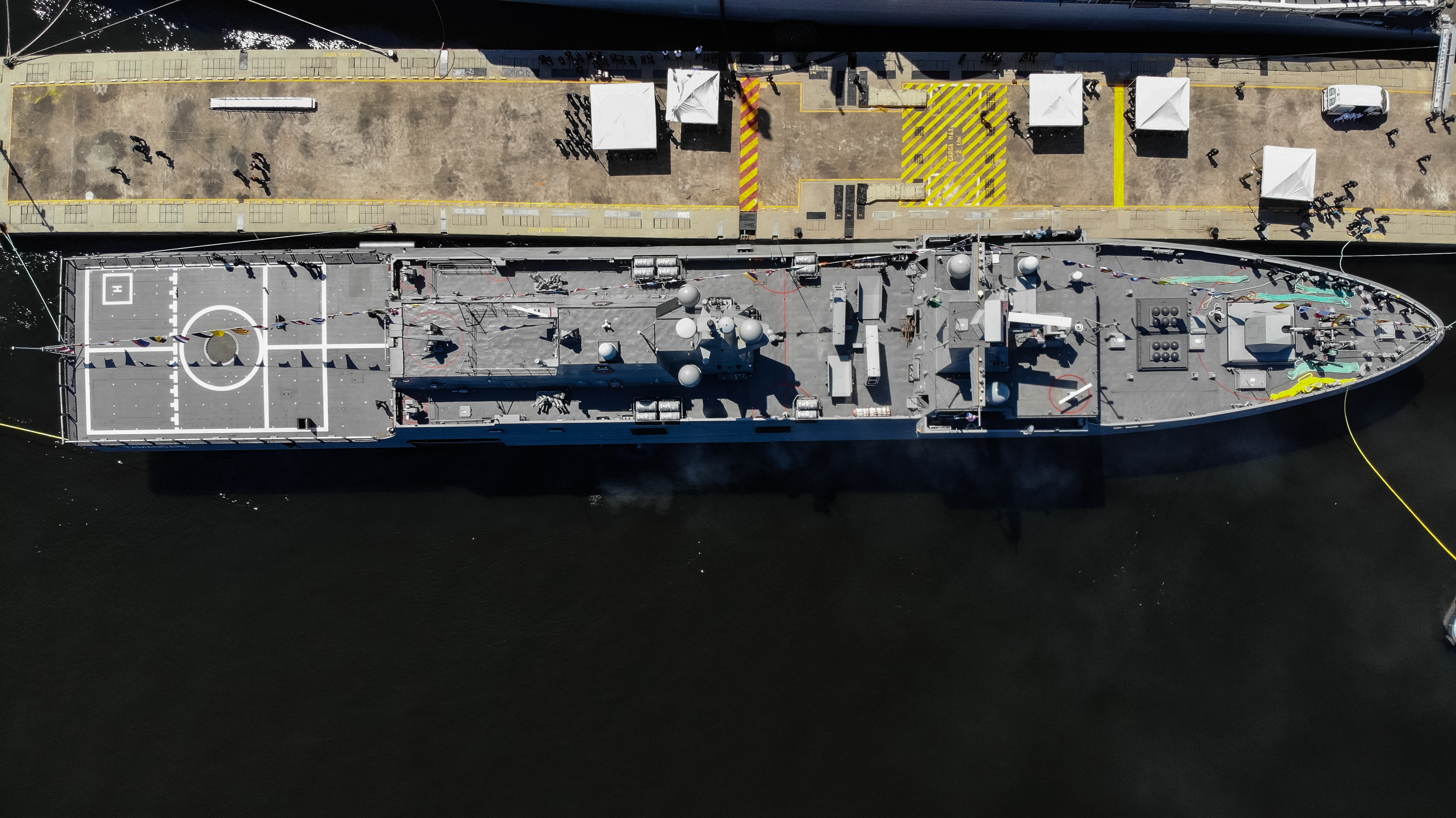
Aerial view of the sensors and weapons of the class

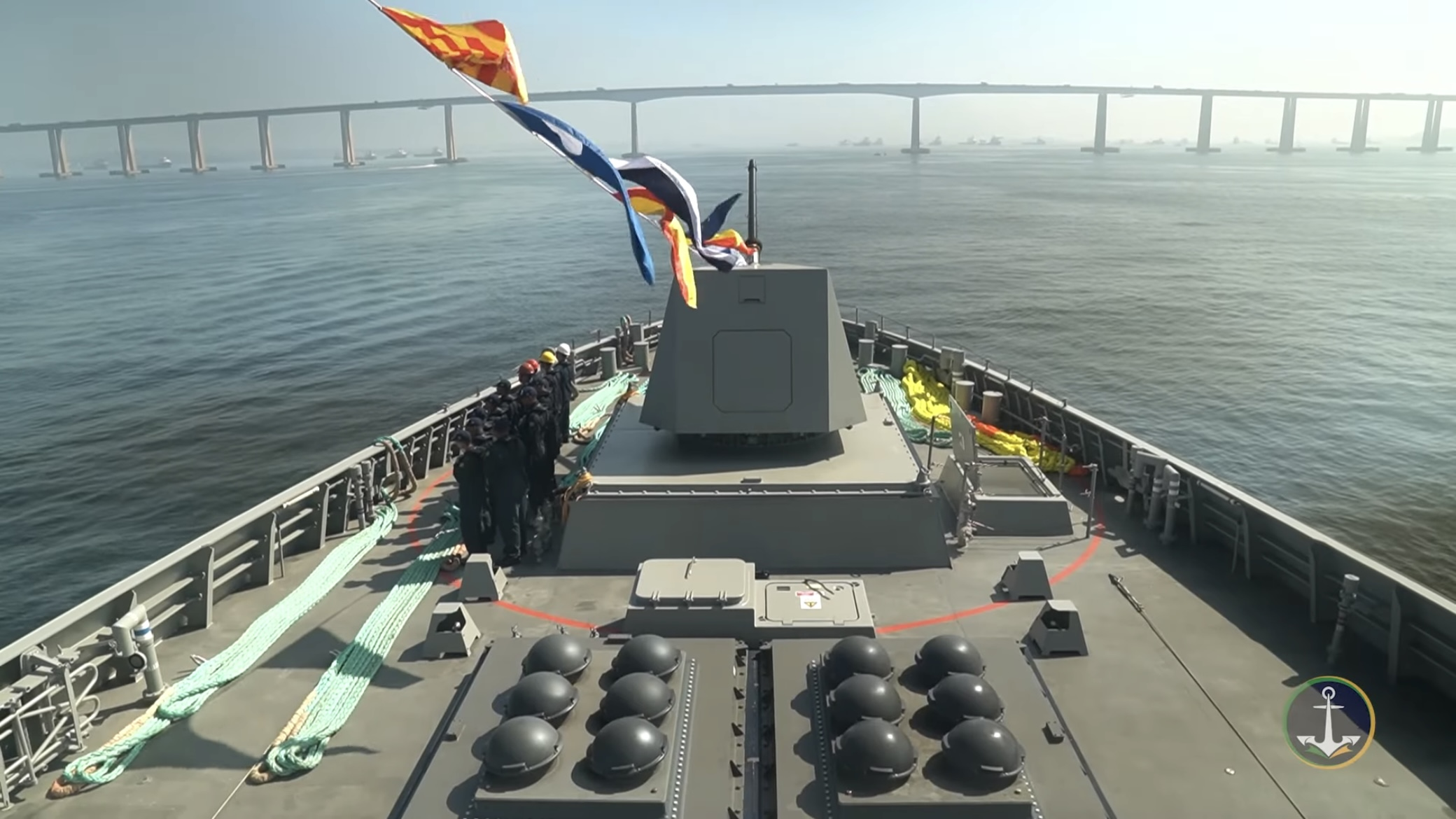
Oto Melara 76 mm naval gun and Sea Ceptor missile silos

Oto Melara 76 mm naval gun at maximum elevation of +85°

Tamandaré's bridge

Tamandaré F200 - 3D Model

Tamandaré during exercises with Argentine MEKO corvettes Espora (P-41) and Rosales (P-42)

Tamandaré and Jerônimo de Albuquerque

== See also ==
- List of frigate classes in service

Equivalent frigates of the same era

- FF(X)
- Mogami class
- Chungnam class
- Thaon di Revel class
- FDI
- Miguel Malvar class
- Istanbul class
- Nilgiri class
