= Almirante Tamandaré (disambiguation) =

Almirante Tamandaré may refer to:

- Joaquim Marques Lisboa, Marquis of Tamandaré, a 19th-century Brazilian military officer
- Almirante Tamandaré, Paraná, a municipality in Brazil
- A number of ships named after the Marquis of Tamandaré
