= Kale Group =

Turkish holding company

- Industry: Conglomerate
- Founded: 1956
- Founder: İbrahim Bodur (1928–2016)
- Headquarters: Beşiktaş, Istanbul, Turkey
- Area served: Turkey
- Key people: Zeynep Bodur Okyay
- Products: Ceramics, armament, chemicals, heavy equipment, household hardware and power tools, machines
- Website: kale.com.tr

Kale Group (Turkish: Kale Grubu) is a Turkish industrial conglomerate with headquarters in Istanbul. Established in 1956, the company's primary activities are in the ceramics, building chemicals, logistics, defense and aviation industries as of 2015.

== History ==
The company was founded by İbrahim Bodur (1928–2016) in 1956 to produce ceramics. In later years, the company entered in metal tools industry in 1969, chemical products industry in 1975, equipment trading in 1978, hardware, machinery and power tools trading, and defense industry. It has many more smaller companies, especially in service sector.

The holding company's headquarters is located in a building located on the Büyükdere Avenue in Levent neighborhood of Beşiktaş district at Istanbul. The company has been chaired by CEO is Zeynep Bodur Okyay (born 1964) since 2007, the daughter of the founder İbrahim Bodur.

== Sub-companies ==
=== Ceramics Industry ===
The first company of the Group was established as "Çanakkale Seramik Fabrikaları A.Ş." ("Çanakkale Ceramic Factories Inc.", in 1956. The plant to produce ceramic floor tiles was built in Çanakkale in 1957. The company united in 2000 with "Kalebodur Seramik Sanayi A.Ş." under the roof "Kaleseramik Çanakkale Kalebodur Seramik Sanayi A.Ş". Production is in progress in four different locations, in Çan and Sameteli at Çanakkale, Yerköy in Yozgat as well as Bandırma in Balıkesir. Kaleseramik, which leads the industry with over 4,500 product varieties in flexible porcelain plates, ceramic floor tiles, ceramic sanitary ware, faucets and bathroom furniture product groups. lt introduces approximately 200 new products to the market every year. The company also delivers its products to customers in the domestic market as well as in 86 countries abroad. In terms of ceramic floor tiles production, it ranks first in Turkey, fifth in Europe and 18th biggest in the world.

=== Metalworking Industry ===
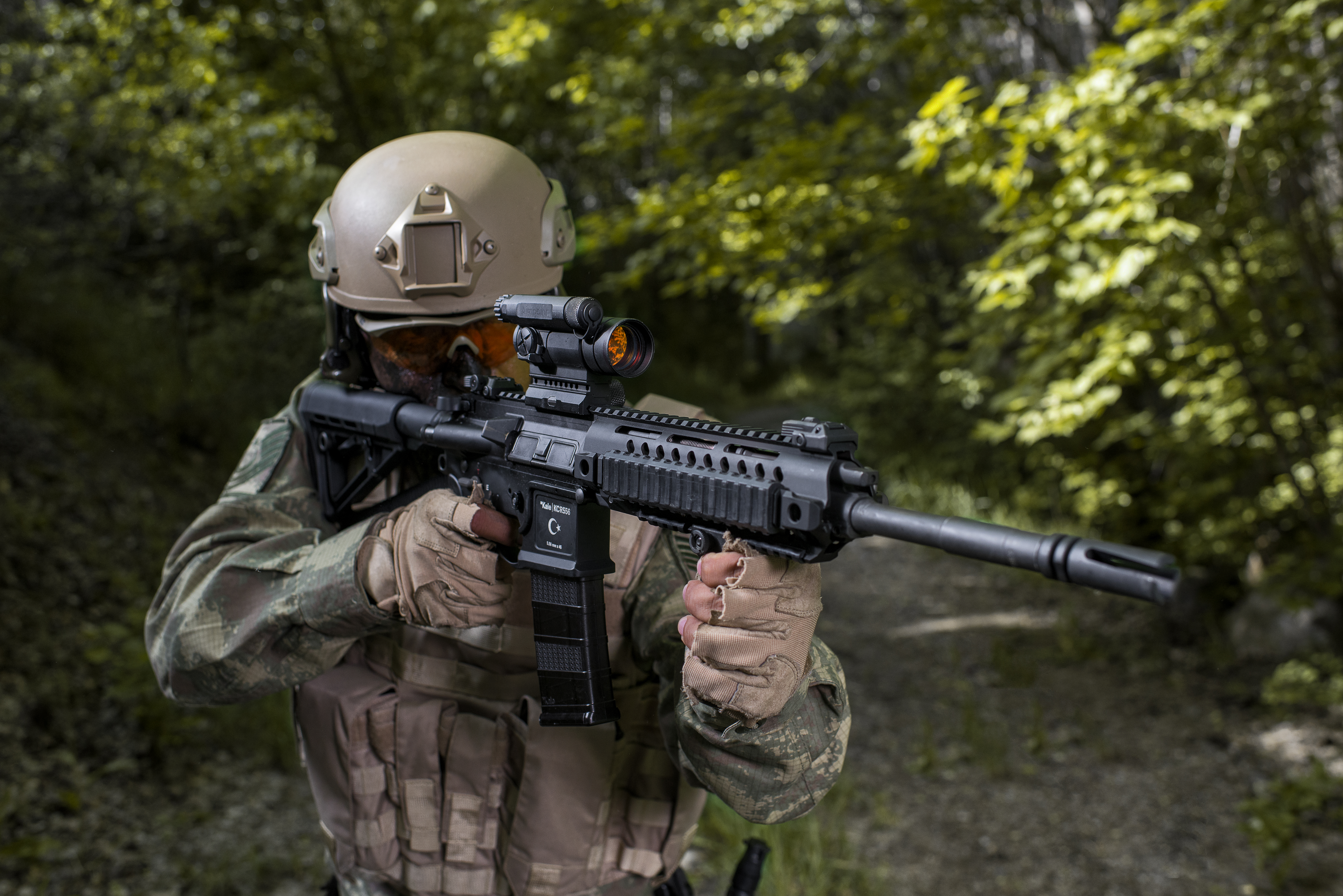
5.56×45mm NATO Kale KCR556 Infantry rifle

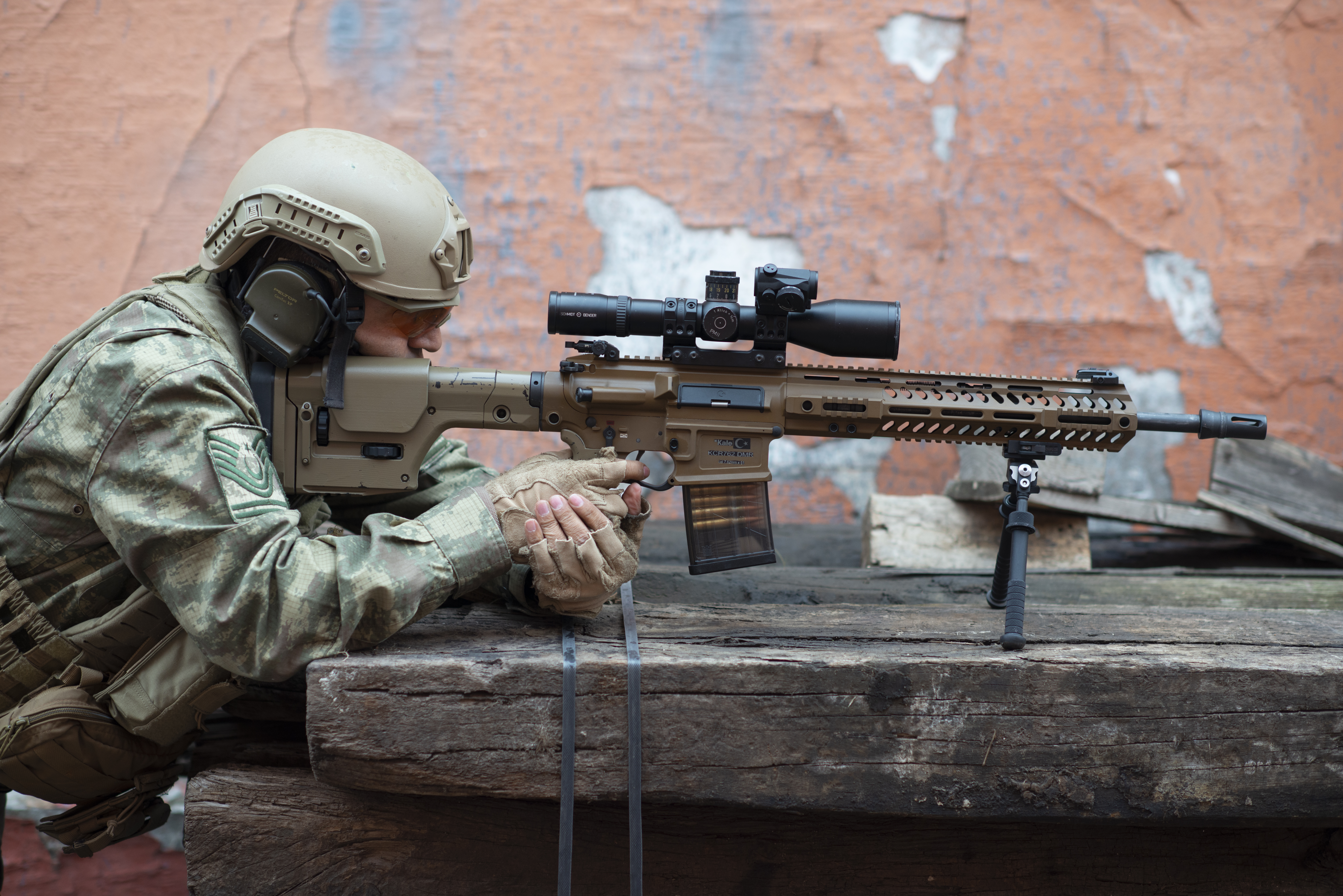
Kale KMR762 – 7.62×51mm NATO / .308 DMR

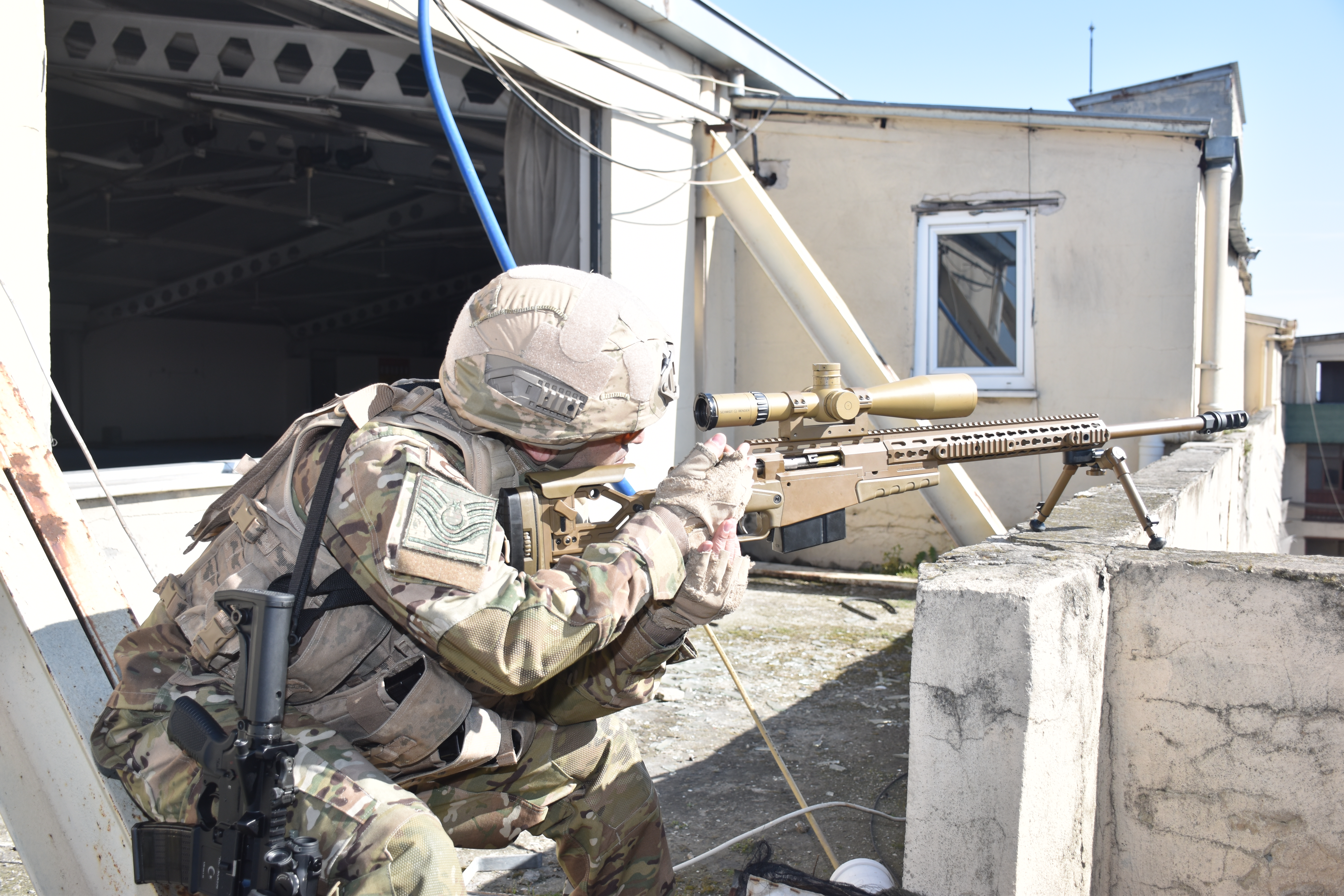
Kale KSR338 – .338 Lapua Magnum / Sniper rifle

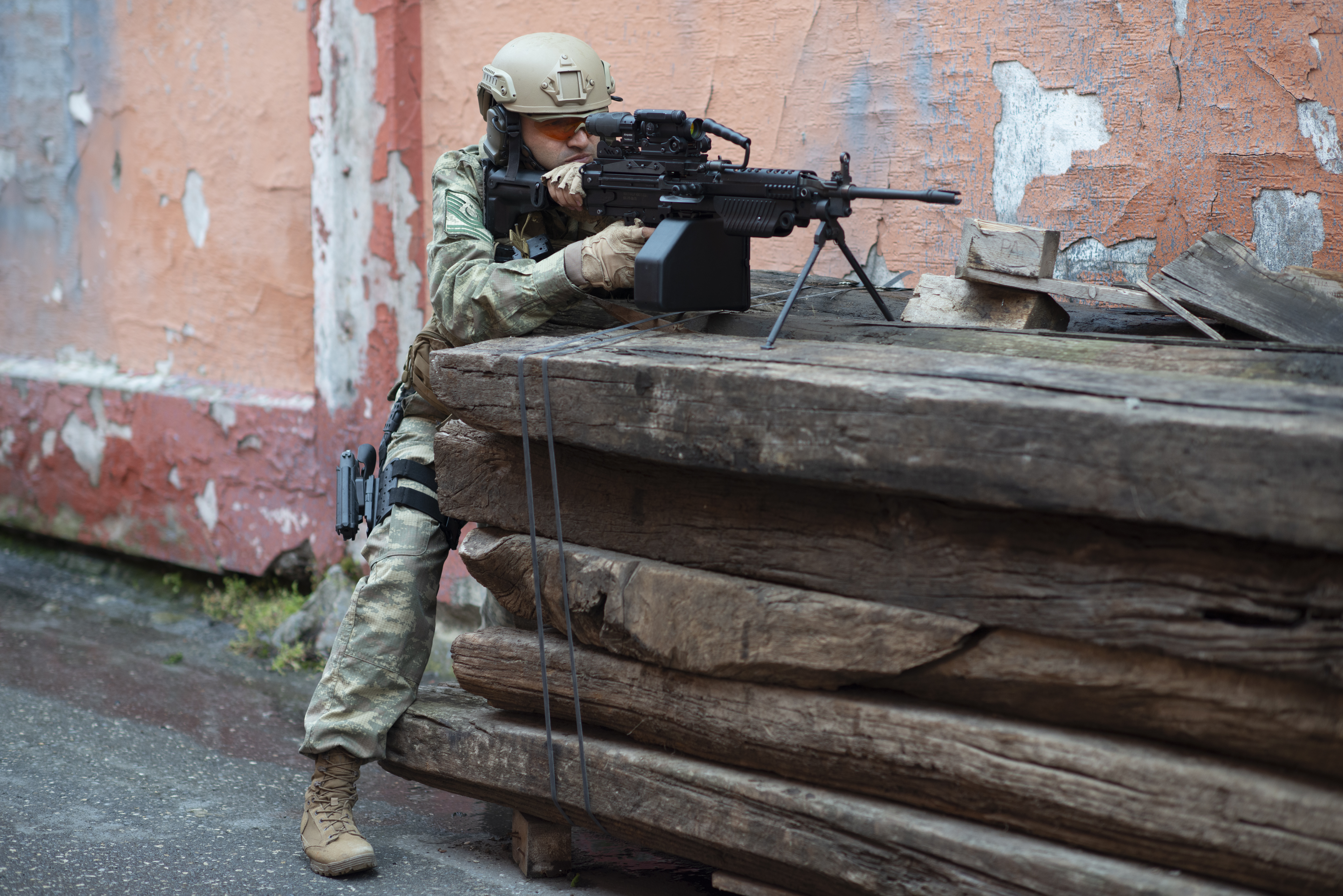
Kale KMG556 – 5.56×45mm NATO / MG

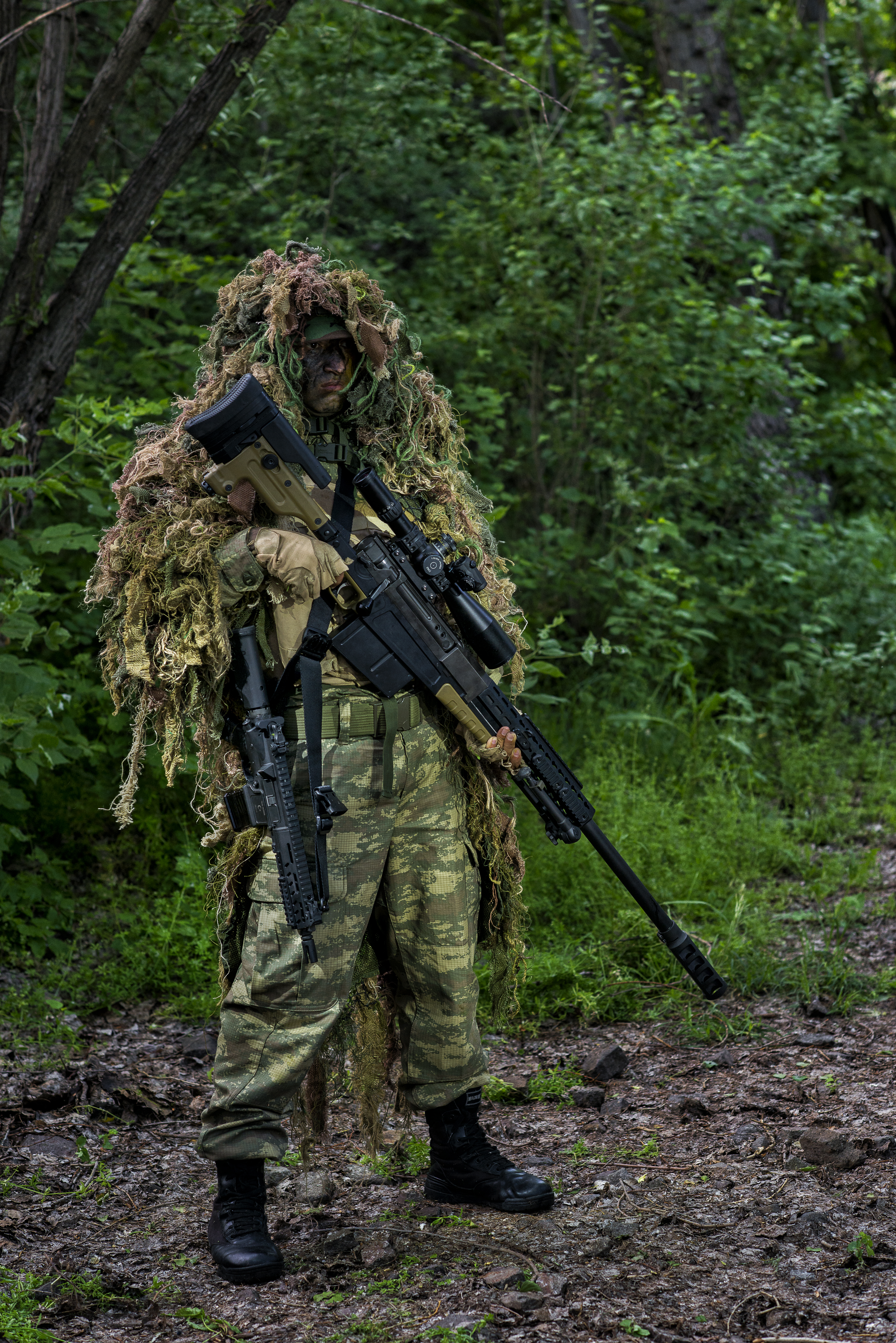
Kale KSR50 – .50 BMG / Sniper rifle

"KaleKalıp" was established in Istanbul in 1969 to design and produce precision moulds, machine parts and special purpose machines. It took part in the production of molds for the Heckler & Koch G3 rifle parts by using its precision mold production capabilities in the 1970s. In 1987, it participated in the Euro Stinger Project and improved its system production, testing and integration capabilities. The company has over 500 employees.

In the 1990s, it took part in the design and manufacturing of multi-barreled rocket launchers platforms of various calibers. Later, it increased its international defense sector experience by taking part in the GMLRS and ATACMS projects with the industry leader Lockheed Martin company and the Rapier project for the MBDA company. In 2005, it designed, qualified and produced Turkey's first 40×46 mm low-velocity grenade launcher OBA-KAGL40, which entered the inventory of the Turkish Armed Forces. It was involved in the design process of Turkey's first national infantry rifle MPT in 2009 as the main subcontractor, and successfully completed the critical design and analysis processes during the 2009–2014 period.

The company introduced the following weapons in 2019, and 2023, which are in use by the Turkish Armed Forces and the Turkish Security Forces:

- KCR556, 5.56×45mm NATO Infantry rifle
- KCR739, 7.62×39mm, Infantry rifle
- KGL40, 40×46 mm low-velocity grenade launcher
- KMG556, Semi-automatic machine gun
- KMR762, Semi-automatic designated marksman rifle
- KNG-C5, 5.56×45mm NATO Personal defense weapon
- KNT-308, 7.62×51mm NATO Sniper rifle
- KSR338, .338 Lapua Magnum Sniper rifle
- KSR50, .50 BMG Sniper rifle

=== Chemicals Industry ===
The chemicals company "Kale Kimya A.Ş." was founded in 1975 by chemical engineer Kazım Kaleağası as the MarmaraRegion distributor of the German chemical company Henkel. Following Turkey's entry into the Customs Union, distribution agreements were signed with the worldwide leading chemical companies in 1997. A laboratory facility was established in 2000. All companies gathered in 2004 in a facility covering an area of 12,000 m^{2} (130,000 sq ft) in Şekerpınar neighborhood of Çayırova, Kocaeli under the group company "Kale Kimya Grubu". In 2008, pre-commercial production started. The production was launched in 2015 in the new plant located at the industrial zone of Düzce. For the Middle East markets, an office and warehouse was founded under the name "Dubai – Chemea" in the Jebel Ali Free Zone in 2016. A research and development center was founded in 2017. A second plant was founded in the industrial zone of Gebze, Kocaeli Province. The company's activities are in the cosmetics, detergent, textiles, adhesives, metal, pharmaceutical, food and Ppool sectors.

The company offered its shares of stock to the public. The shares began to be traded in the Borsa Istanbul as BIST:KLKIM on 18 May 2021.

=== Equipment Trading ===
"Kale Makina Pazarlama A.Ş." (Kale Equipment Marketing Inc.") was founded in 1978 to trade with construction equipment and spare parts. It offers the products of American construction equipment of Gehl (2006), Japanese construction equipment of Kubota (2007), British dumpers of Thwaites (2013) and Finnish loaders of Avant Equipment (2016). In 2011, the company moved into a building of 1,400 m^{2} (15,000 sq ft) on 3,500 m^{2} (38,000 sq ft) area. In 2017, a customs space of 10,000 m^{2} (110,000 sq ft) and a 550 m^{2} (5,900 sq ft) open area were added.

=== Hardware, Machinery and Power tools Trading ===
"Kale Hırdavat ve Makina A.Ş. (Kale Hardware and Machinery Inc.") was established to supply hardware, machinery and power tools.

=== Defense Industry ===
"Kale Savunma" ("Kale Defense") was founded by Özgür Dönmez to serve the defense industry in the industrial zone of İvedikköy neighborhood at Yenimahalle, Ankara on 13 January 2015. due to high competition in the market, the company changed its sector, and started to produce injection molding machines. It features a great number of CNC machines like CNC Vertical (machining machines), CNC lathe machines, laser cutting machines, coordinate-measuring machines and welding machines.

=== Kale Jet Engines ===
Kale Jet Engines was established to produce engines for cruise missiles. The development of the first missile engine began in 2018. The engines produced are; KTJ 1750, KTJ-3200, KTJ-3700.
