= Roraima-class patrol vessel =

- Roraima

Class overview
- Name: Roraima class
- Builders: MacLaren Shipyards; Rio de Janeiro Navy Arsenal (AMRJ)
- Operators: Brazilian Navy; Paraguayan Navy
- Preceded by: Pedro Teixeira class
- Succeeded by: Macaé class
- In commission: 1972–present
- Completed: 4 (1 Paraguayan Navy)
- Active: 4 (1 Paraguayan Navy)

General characteristics
- Type: Patrol vessel
- Displacement: 340 tons standard, 365 tons full load
- Length: 46.3 m (151 ft 11 in)
- Beam: 8.45 m (27 ft 9 in)
- Draught: 1.4 m (4 ft 7 in)
- Installed power: Brazilian vessels; 2,200 hp (1,600 kW); Itaipú; 1,800 hp (1,300 kW)
- Propulsion: Brazilian vessels; 2 Volvo Penta D49A MS V12 diesel engines; Itaipú; 2 MAN V6V16/18TL diesel engines
- Speed: Brazilian vessels; 17 knots (31 km/h; 20 mph); Itaipú; 14.5 knots (26.9 km/h; 16.7 mph)
- Range: Brazilian vessels; 6,000 nmi (11,000 km; 6,900 mi) at 15 knots (28 km/h; 17 mph); Itaipú; 6,000 nmi (11,000 km; 6,900 mi) at 12 knots (22 km/h; 14 mph)
- Boats & landing craft carried: Brazilian vessels; 2 × fast action boats, with capacity for up to 15 men, speed of 35 knots (65 km/h; 40 mph) and armed with a 7.62 mm machine gun
- Complement: 56 (5 officers)
- Sensors & processing systems: Brazilian vessels; 2 Decca navigation radars; Itaipú; 1 navigation radar
- Armament: Brazilian vessels; 1 × Bofors L/70 40 mm cannon; 2 × Oerlikon 20 mm cannon; 4 × .50 cal. machine guns; 2 × 81 mm mortar combined with 2 .50 cal machine guns; Itaipú; 1 × Bofors L/60 40 mm cannon; 2 × .50 cal. machine guns; 2 × 81 mm mortar combined with 2 .50 cal machine guns
- Aircraft carried: Itaipú; 1 × Airbus H125 Helicopter

The Roraima class are a series of riverine patrol vessels of the Brazilian and Paraguayan Navy built at MacLaren Shipyards and AMRJ, in Niterói, Rio de Janeiro and were commissioned between the end of 1975 and 1984. They are also equipped with a medical and dental office, as well as an infirmary.

In the early 2000s, the three Brazilian ships of the class underwent re-engining, with their MAN V616/18TL engines being replaced by Volvo Penta model D49A MS V12, which allowed for an increase in speed from 14.5 to 17 knots (26.9 to 31.5 km/h; 16.7 to 19.6 mph), as well as greater fuel economy.

== ARP Itaipú ==
At the end of 1982, the Paraguayan government requested Rio de Janeiro Navy Arsenal to build a patrol vessel, which was based on the Roraima class. This ship was launched in March 1984 and commissioned in 1985. However, the ship has several modifications compared to the original class, such as the removal of the 20 mm cannons and two .50-caliber machine guns, the inability of carrying boats, the use of the old L/60 gun and the inclusion of a flight deck, which has capacity for an H125.

== Ships in class ==
Name	Hull number	Builders	Launched	Commissioned	Status
Roraima	P-30	MacLaren Shipyards	9 November 1972	21 February 1975	Active
Rondônia	P-31	MacLaren Shipyards	10 January 1973	3 December 1975	Active
Amapá	P-32	MacLaren Shipyards	10 March 1974	12 January 1976	Active
Itaipú	P-05	Rio de Janeiro Navy Arsenal	16 March 1984	2 April 1985	Active
