= Pedro Teixeira-class patrol vessel =

- Pedro Teixeira (P-20)

Class overview
- Name: Pedro Teixeira class
- Builders: Rio de Janeiro Navy Arsenal (AMRJ)
- Operators: Brazilian Navy
- Preceded by: Piratini class
- Succeeded by: Roraima class
- In commission: 1973–present
- Completed: 2
- Active: 2

General characteristics
- Type: Patrol vessel
- Displacement: 690 tons standard, 950 tons full load
- Length: 63.74 m (209 ft 1 in)
- Beam: 9.74 m (31 ft 11 in)
- Draught: 1.7 m (5 ft 7 in)
- Installed power: 3,800 hp (2,800 kW)
- Propulsion: 4 MAN V6V16/18TLS diesel engines
- Speed: 16.4 knots (30.4 km/h; 18.9 mph)
- Range: 5,000 nmi (9,300 km; 5,800 mi) at 13 knots (24 km/h; 15 mph)
- Boats & landing craft carried: 2 × fast action boats, with a portable echo sounder, capacity for up to 15 men, speed of 35 knots (65 km/h; 40 mph) and armed with a 7.62 mm machine gun
- Troops: 30 marines or 80 for short periods
- Complement: 80 (7 officers and 18 petty officers and sergeants)
- Sensors & processing systems: 1 Furuno FR-1505 Mk.3 navigation, 1 X-band navigation radar and 2 fixed echo sounders
- Armament: 1 × Bofors L/70 40 mm cannon; 2 × Oerlikon 20 mm cannon; 4 × .50 cal. machine guns; 2 × 81 mm mortar
- Aircraft carried: 1 × Airbus H125 Helicopter
- Aviation facilities: flight deck and hangar
- Notes: Crane with a capacity of 6 tons; Radiotelephony and radiodata communication equipment.

The Pedro Teixeira class are a series of riverine patrol vessels of the Brazilian Navy built at Rio de Janeiro Navy Arsenal (AMRJ), in Rio de Janeiro and were commissioned in 1973. The class is named in honor of the Portuguese explorer Pedro Teixeira. These ships are part of the Amazon Flotilla.

== List of ships ==
Hull number	Name	Laid down	Launched	Commissioned	Status	Byuilder	Subordinação
P-20	Pedro Teixeira	14 October 1970	11 June 1972	17 December 1973	Active	Rio de Janeiro (AMRJ)	Flotilha do Amazonas
P-21	Raposo Tavares	14 October 1970	11 June 1972	17 December 1973	Active	Rio de Janeiro (AMRJ)	Flotilha do Amazonas
