= SIATT =

Brazilian missile manufacturer (e. 2017)

- Type: Private limited company
- Industry: Arms, Aerospace
- Founded: 2017; 9 years ago
- Headquarters: São José dos Campos, Brazil
- Area served: Worldwide
- Products: Missiles
- Website: siatt.com.br

Sistemas Integrados de Alto Teor Tecnológico (SIATT) is a Brazilian arms company founded in 2017 and headquartered in São Paulo. It primarily develops and manufactures precision-guided munitions. It supplies missiles and training to the Brazilian Armed Forces.

In September 2023, the United Arab Emirates-based defense conglomerate EDGE Group acquired a 50% stake in SIATT. The transaction included a technical partnership with the Brazilian Navy and was signed in Brazil by EDGE Group Chief Executive Officer Mansour Al Mulla alongside senior company executives. According to EDGE officials, the deal was intended to expand and strengthen strategic defense cooperation between both nations.

On July 8, 2025, the Brazilian Navy awarded SIATT an initial production contract for a first batch of 16 operational MANSUP missiles. This order marked the system's official transition from development to active military service.

== Notable products ==
- MANSUP family: Anti-ship, land-attack and surface-to-air missiles;
- MAX 1.2 AC: Laser-guided anti-tank missile.
