= Microturbo TRI-40 =

Turbojet engine for missiles and UAVs

TRI-40
- Type: Single Spool Turbojet
- National origin: France
- Manufacturer: Microturbo
- First run: June 1999 (rated)
- Major applications: Kongsberg Naval Strike Missile
- Developed from: Microturbo TRI 60

The Microturbo TRI-40 is a small turbojet engine developed for use in cruise missiles and small unmanned aerial vehicles in the 2.2 - 3.6 kN (500 - 800 lbf) thrust class.

== Development and Design ==
The TRI-40 engine is a modified version of the Microturbo TRI 60 class of small turbojets, designed to be smaller and lighter for new missiles. It is currently being used on the Kongsberg Naval Strike Missile (NSM) for the Royal Norwegian Navy and the updated MM-40 Exocet Block 3 anti-ship missile.

There are several differences between the TRI-40 and the older TRI-60 engines. One is that the -40 uses a 4-stage compressor rather than the 3 stage compressor that the original TRI-60 models use (although several newer variants of the TRI-60 use a 4-stage compressor as well). Another major difference is that the bearing system is lubricated by fuel rather than a separate oil system. Finally, the engine is much more "electric" than the TRI-60. It has a permanent magnet based generator (270 V DC) mounted directly on the engine shaft, which older engines lacked, as well as an ECU controlled fuel metering system.

== Specifications (TRI-40) ==
Data from

==== General characteristics ====
- Type: single-spool turbojet
- Length: 680 mm (26.77 in)
- Diameter: 280 mm (11.02 in)
- Dry weight: 44 kg (97 lb)

==== Components ====
- Compressor: 4 stage axial
- Combustors: annular
- Turbine: single-stage
- Fuel type: JP-8, JP-10 (fuel)

==== Performance ====
- Maximum thrust: 2.5-3.3 kN (560-750 lbf)
- Turbine inlet temperature: 1010 °C (1850 °F)
- Specific fuel consumption: 1.2 lb/(lbf⋅h) or 34 g/(kN⋅s)
- Thrust-to-weight ratio: 5.7 - 7.3

== See also ==
Comparable engines

- Williams F107

Related lists

- List of aircraft engines
