= Brazilian cruiser Almirante Tamandaré (1890) =

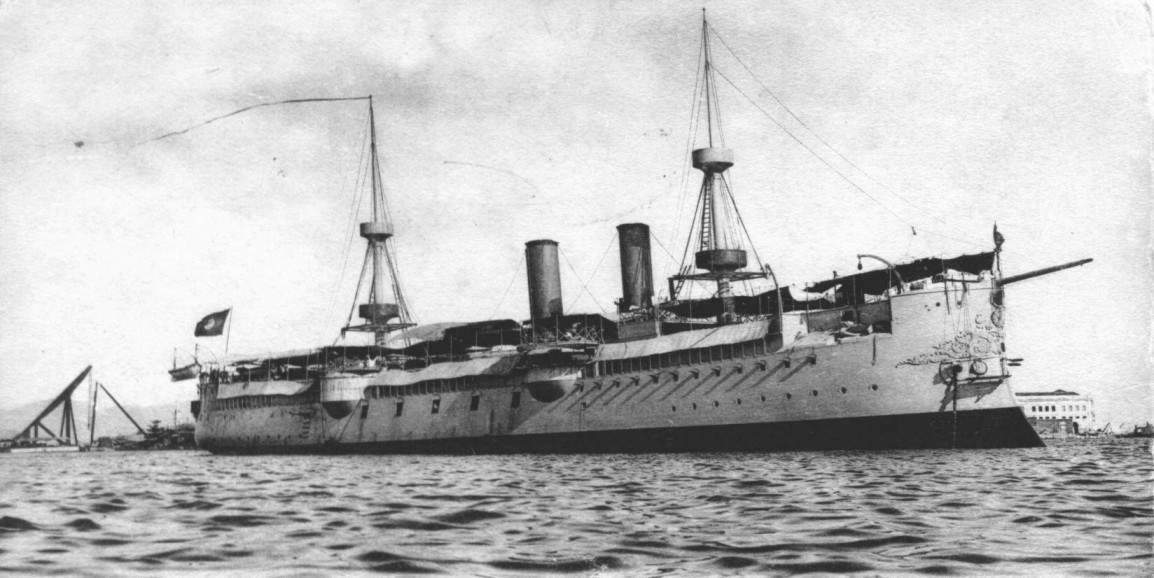
- Almirante Tamandaré

History

Brazil
- Name: Almirante Tamandaré
- Namesake: Marquess of Tamandaré
- Builder: Arsenal de Marinha do Rio de Janeiro
- Cost: 3.700:000$000 réis
- Laid down: 1884
- Launched: 20 March 1890
- Completed: 1893
- Fate: Discarded, 1920

General characteristics
- Type: Protected cruiser
- Displacement: 4,735 t
- Length: 294 ft 2 in (89.66 m)
- Beam: 47 ft 4 in (14.43 m)
- Draft: 19 ft 9 in (6.02 m)
- Propulsion: 2 shaft HTE (triple-expansion reciprocating steam engines), 2 × screw propellers
- Speed: 17 kn (20 mph; 31 km/h)
- Capacity: 400 to 750 tons of coal
- Complement: 400
- Armament: 10 × 6 in (150 mm) guns (10 × 1); 2 × 4.7 in (120 mm) guns (2 × 1); 10 × 3-pounder guns
- Armor: Deck: 1.6 in (41 mm); Casemates : 3 in (76 mm); Conning tower : 2 in (51 mm)

Almirante Tamandaré was a protected cruiser operated by the Brazilian Navy from 1897 to 1915. The construction of the cruiser was the result of Brazil's effort to develop a large steel ship, but the country had no experience with this type of ship, and the project resulted in an unreliable vessel.

The ship measured 95.92 meters in maximum length, 14.43 meters in beam, 7.06 meters in depth, 6.02 meters in maximum draft, and displaced 4,537 tons, which made it the largest warship built in Brazil to this day. The main battery consisted of ten 152 mm cannons. Propulsion consisted of masts and steam engines. After construction, in 1890, it remained anchored in Rio de Janeiro due to navigability problems. Even before being commissioned, it was taken over by rebels during the Navy Revolt (1893–1894), and used against the federal government.

Navigability problems prevented the ship from carrying out commissions, and it only carried out two or three in its entire career. The likely first trip would have been to Santa Catarina, still under rebel control. The second was in 1908, when it traveled to Bahia. On this trip, the crew was unable to control the vessel, leaving it adrift and subsequently running aground near Morro de São Paulo. It was only after being rescued by cruisers that the vessel was able to return to Rio de Janeiro. After this trip, it was permanently anchored in the Port of Rio de Janeiro, serving as a naval school for midshipmen and cabin boys until 1914. The navy decommissioned it on 27 December 1915, and it was sent for dismantling in 1920.

== Characteristics ==
Almirante Tamandaré had the following characteristics: steel construction, a double hull with 119 water tanks lined with 175 millimeters of peroba hardwood. This coating had the characteristic of being adapted to the side using galvanized iron dowels. The ship measured 95.92 meters in maximum length, 86.67 meters in length between perpendiculars, 14.43 meters in extreme beam, 14.03 meters in molded beam, 7.06 meters in depth, 6.02 meters in maximum draft, and 4,537 tons of displacement. The armament consisted of ten rapid-fire 152-millimeter Armstrong cannons, two 120-millimeter cannons; ten 47mm Nordenfelt cannons; eight machine guns; and eight torpedo tubes. In 1897, the 157mm guns were retubed.

The cruiser's propulsion system was mixed. Originally, the ship was equipped with three galley masts, with a sail area on deck measuring 1,612 square meters. It had two alternative steam engines, built in London in the Maudslay Sons & Field workshops. It had seven boilers and 28 furnaces. All this apparatus developed 6,500 horsepower and up to 7,500 horsepower when the engines were forced, propelling the cruiser to a speed of 17 knots (31.48 kilometers per hour). The ship had small auxiliary vessels attached to the hull: two steam boats, a rowing boat, a lifeboat, and five other longboats and two lifeboats.

== Construction ==
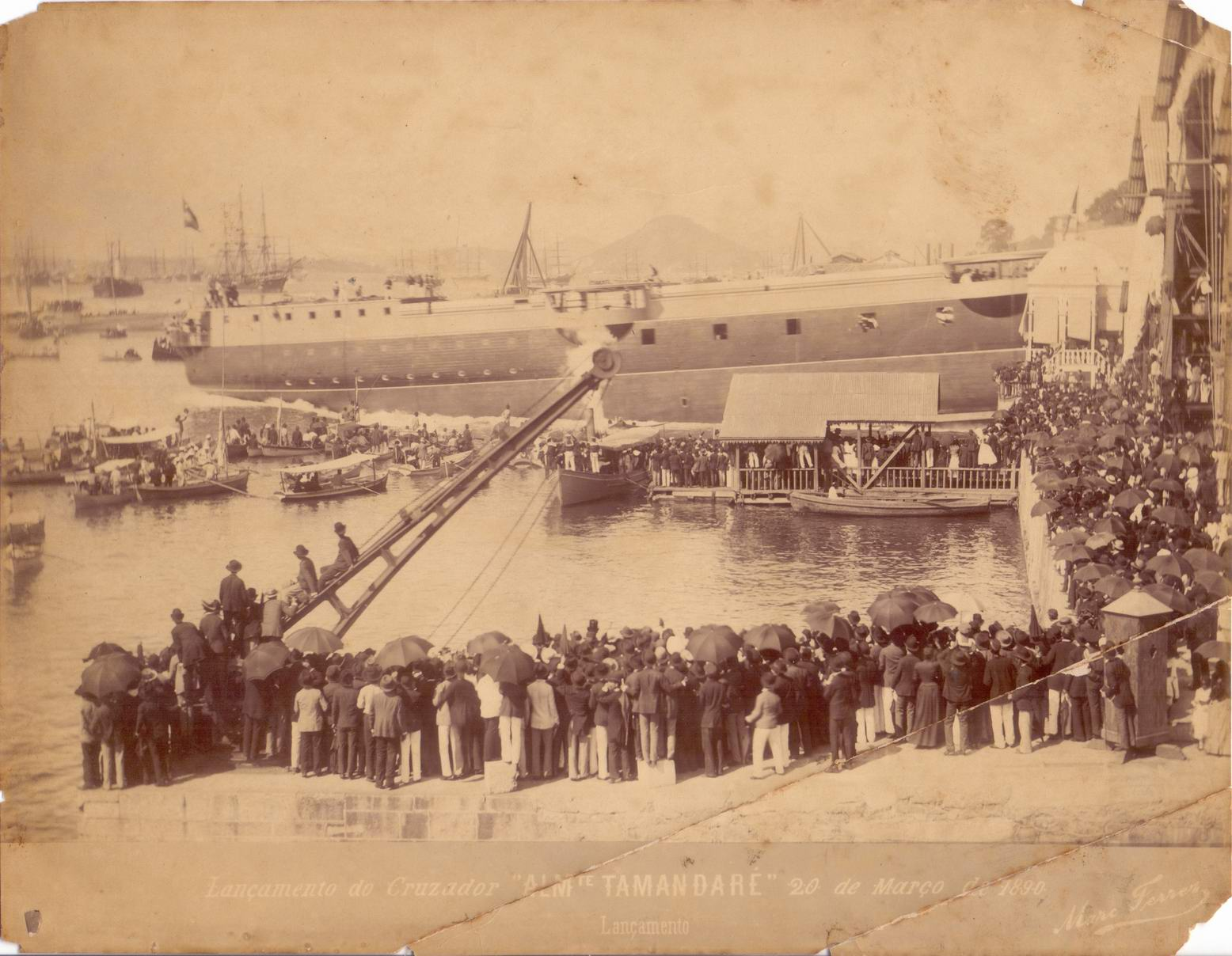
Launch of Almirante Tamandaré on 20 March 1890

Almirante Tamandaré was built at the shipyard No. 1 of the Rio de Janeiro Navy Arsenal, during Brazil's imperial period. It followed the design of naval engineer João Cândido Brazil as determined by the Minister of the Navy, senator João Florentino Meira de Vasconcelos in 1883, at a cost of 3,700:000$000 réis. The project would design a ship with great offensive and defensive capabilities.

Construction began in 1884 and was under the supervision of Arthur Silveira da Motta, the Baron of Jaceguai and, later, Francisco Pereira Pinto, the Baron of Ivinheima, when it was completed. The name Almirante Tamandaré, the second vessel to bear it in the Brazilian Navy, is a tribute to admiral Joaquim Marques Lisboa, the Marquess of Tamandaré and patron of the Brazilian Navy. The keel was laid in 1884 and the launch took place on 20 March 1890. Still during the construction phase, admiral Tamandaré asked the minister of the navy Eduardo Wandenkolk that the vessel be named Almirante Cochrane, in honor of Thomas Cochrane, a British officer and frigate commander who fought on Brazil's side in the country's war of independence, however the request was not met. The cruiser is the largest warship built to date in Brazil, with more than 4,500 tons of displacement.

== Service ==
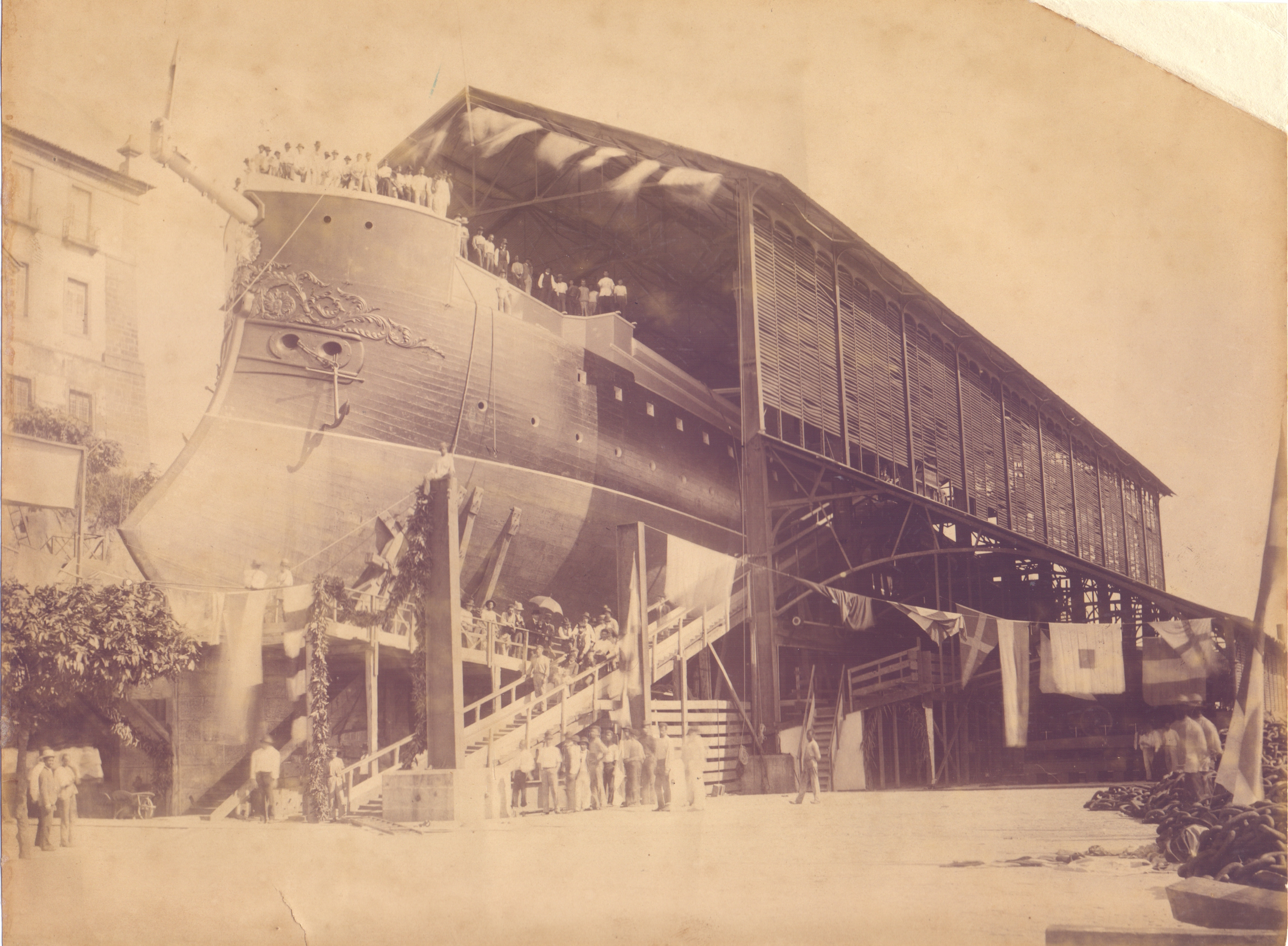
Almirante Tamandaré in construction

Before its incorporation into the Brazilian fleet, Almirante Tamandaré remained anchored in the port of Rio de Janeiro for many years due to a navigability problem that was never resolved. Therefore, during the Navy Revolt (1893–1894), the ship was used by the rebels before it was even officially commissioned. The cruiser's first commander was captain of sea and war Frederico Guilherme Lorena, one of the leaders of the revolt. It is likely that the vessel was in the fleet that headed to the south of the country, in Desterro (Florianópolis), led by Custódio de Melo, to try to gain support from the federalists, but without success. During the fighting in Guanabara Bay against the troops of president Floriano Peixoto, the cruiser's artillery proved efficient, according to the crew's report. After the end of the revolt, the ship remained in Rio de Janeiro until it was commissioned on 27 November 1897.

After incorporation, the ship had to undergo repairs in 1897. Its galley frame was replaced by two military masts. The castle received a new metal fan and the fast cannons were removed. Despite the renovations, many deficiencies still remained, forcing the ship to be permanently anchored in Rio de Janeiro. Between 1901 and 1902, Almirante Tamandaré served as a barracks for midshipmen, and from 1906 to 1914, as the headquarters of the Professional Schools and the Cabin School; at this time the ship was called a school cruiser.

Due to its construction problems, the vessel was very unreliable and therefore made few trips. Despite the effort to build a large steel ship by its own means, Brazil did not have any experience in this area, resulting in the construction of a warship of low quality. In August 1908, the cruiser traveled to Bahia, passing through Vitória between 20 and 24 August. When it approached Morro de São Paulo, in the state of Bahia, the crew was no longer able to control the vessel, and it became adrift. The auxiliary ship Andrada tried to tow it, but the cruiser ended up running aground in the same region. It was later rescued by the cruisers República and Tiradentes and a tug. It returned to Rio de Janeiro and remained as the headquarters of naval schools, in Guanabara Bay, until 1914. The following year, on 27 December, it was discharged from active service. The cruiser was scrapped in 1920. Because of its deficiencies, it never carried out more than two or three commissions (trips) in its entire career.

== See also ==
- List of historical ships of the Brazilian Navy
