= MANSUP (missile family) =

Brazilian family of missiles

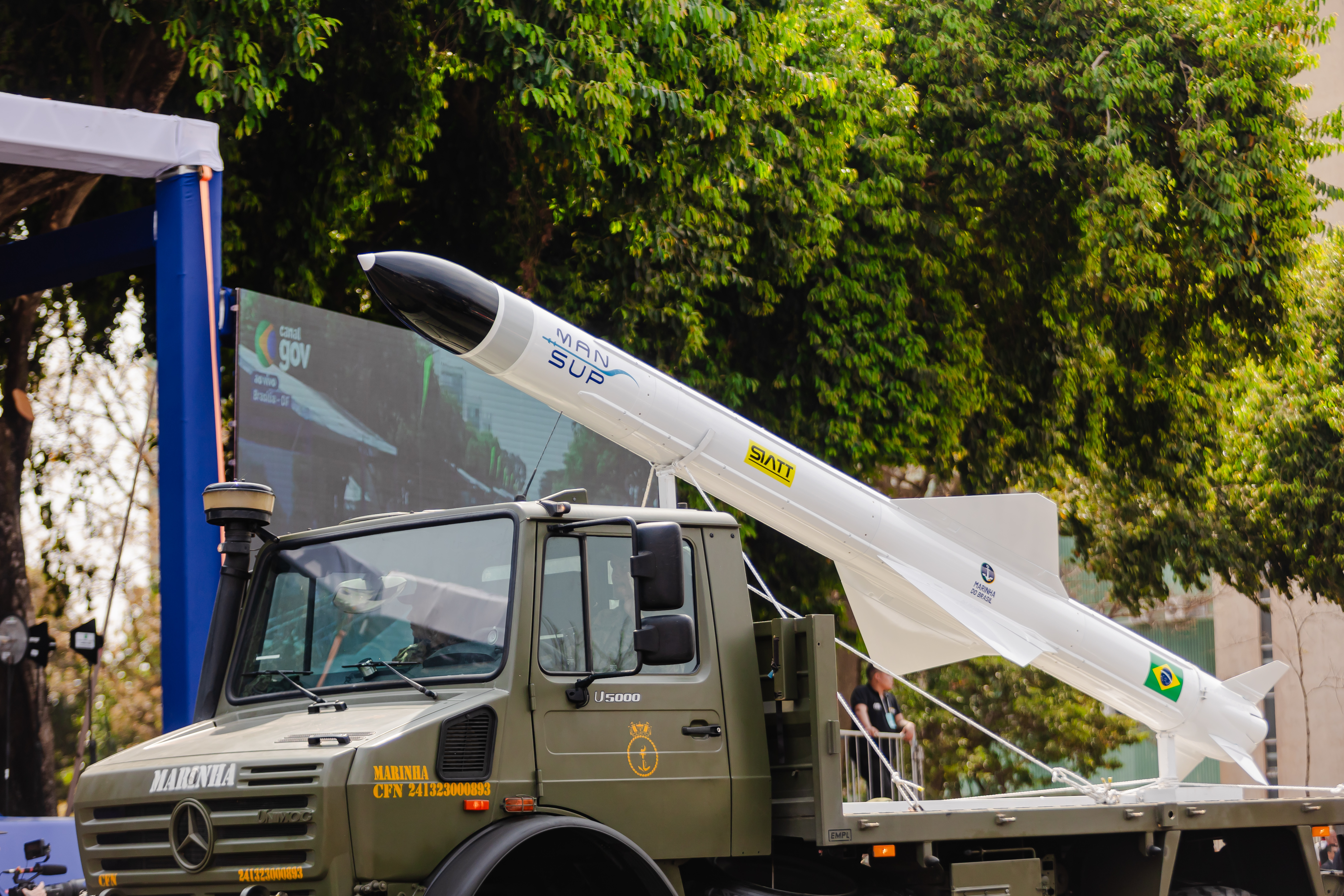
- The original AShM variant, 2024
- Type: Anti-ship missile / Land-attack cruise missile / Surface-to-air missile / Air-to-surface missile
- Place of origin: Brazil: MANSUP; Brazil & United Arab Emirates: MANSUP-ER, MSA, MAS, MARSUP

Service history
- In service: 2018

Production history
- Designer: SIATT; EDGE Group
- Designed: 2004

Specifications
- Length: MANSUP & MANSUP-ER: 4700 mm
- Diameter: MANSUP & MANSUP-ER: 330 mm
- Warhead weight: MANSUP & MANSUP-ER: 150 kg
- Operational range: MANSUP: 70 km (43 mi); MANSUP-ER: 200 km (120 mi)
- Flight altitude: MANSUP & MANSUP-ER: Sea-skimming
- Maximum speed: MANSUP: 870 km/h; MANSUP-ER: 950 km/h
- Guidance system: INS, Active radar homing
- Launch platform: Tamandaré-class frigates Abu Dhabi-class corvettes Astros II

MANSUP are a Brazilian-Emirati family of all-weather, over-the-horizon anti-ship, surface-to-air, air-to-surface and land-attack missiles, that evolved into a broad range of weapons from an early-2000s original design of an anti-ship missile that aimed to achieve performance similar to the MBDA MM40 Exocet Block II. The name MANSUP stands for "Míssil Antinavio Nacional de Superfície" in Portuguese.

== History ==
Missile test conducted by the frigate Rademaker

A mock-up of the Brazilian Navy and Avibras project for an anti-ship missile inspired by the AM39 Exocet was shown in April 2011 during Latin America Aero and Defence (LAAD) exhibition in Rio de Janeiro.

An initial asset of R$50 million was sponsored by the Brazilian Navy, through the Directorate of Navy Weapons Systems, contracts were signed on 5 and 6 December 2011, with Mectron and Avibras, respectively. Program participants were assigned according to their specialties, Mectron being assigned to prototype development, Avibras to rocket engine development, Omnisys to seeker-head development and Atech to project accompaniment management.

In 2013, Omnisys concluded the missile seeker PDR (Preliminary Design Review) and started to test all subsystem parts. Development of an air launched variant of the missile called Missil Antinavio Nacional lancado por Aeronaves (MANAER) commenced in February 2014.

On 27 November 2018, the first missile prototype was fired from the Brazilian Navy corvette Barroso (V34). On 20 March 2019, a second launch was carried out by the frigate Independência (F44). A third prototype was fired once again by the F44 on 10 July.

On 20 September 2022, the Navy conducted the fourth launch of MANSUP from the frigate Constituição (F42), as part of the qualifying campaign, ahead of the series produced missiles.

On 27 April 2023, the Navy conducted the fifth test launch of MANSUP.

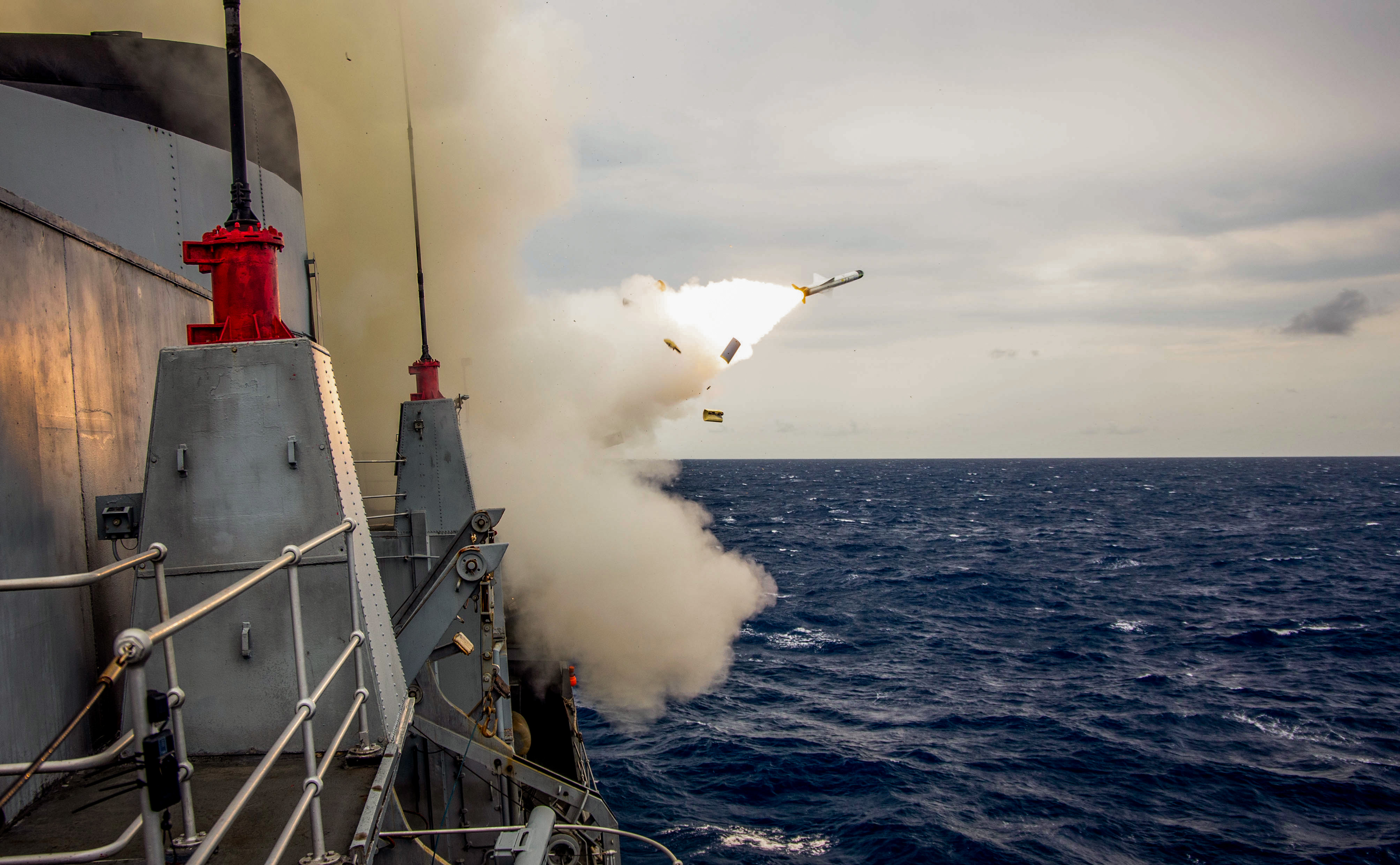
Missile fired by the frigate Constituição

On 29 September 2023, EDGE Group of the United Arab Emirates became a partner in the project, with the acquisition of 50% stake of SIATT, former Mectron. On 14 November 2023, EDGE announced at the Dubai Air Show, an extended range of MANSUP, with a maximum range of 200 km. The MANSUP-ER was acquired by the Brazilian and United Arab Emirates navies in 2023.

In February 2024, the Brazilian Navy conducted the sixth test launch of MANSUP, with a hit on target, as reported by the Navy Commander Marcos Sampaio Olsen. In the same month the Navy conducted a SINKEX with the former RFA Sir Galahad and it is unclear whether the boat was targeted by the referred MANSUP missile.

On 13 September 2024, the Navy fired the seventh test missile from the frigate Rademaker (F49) in a SINKEX with the former HMS Broadsword and is expected to declare the MANSUP fully operational by the end of 2025.

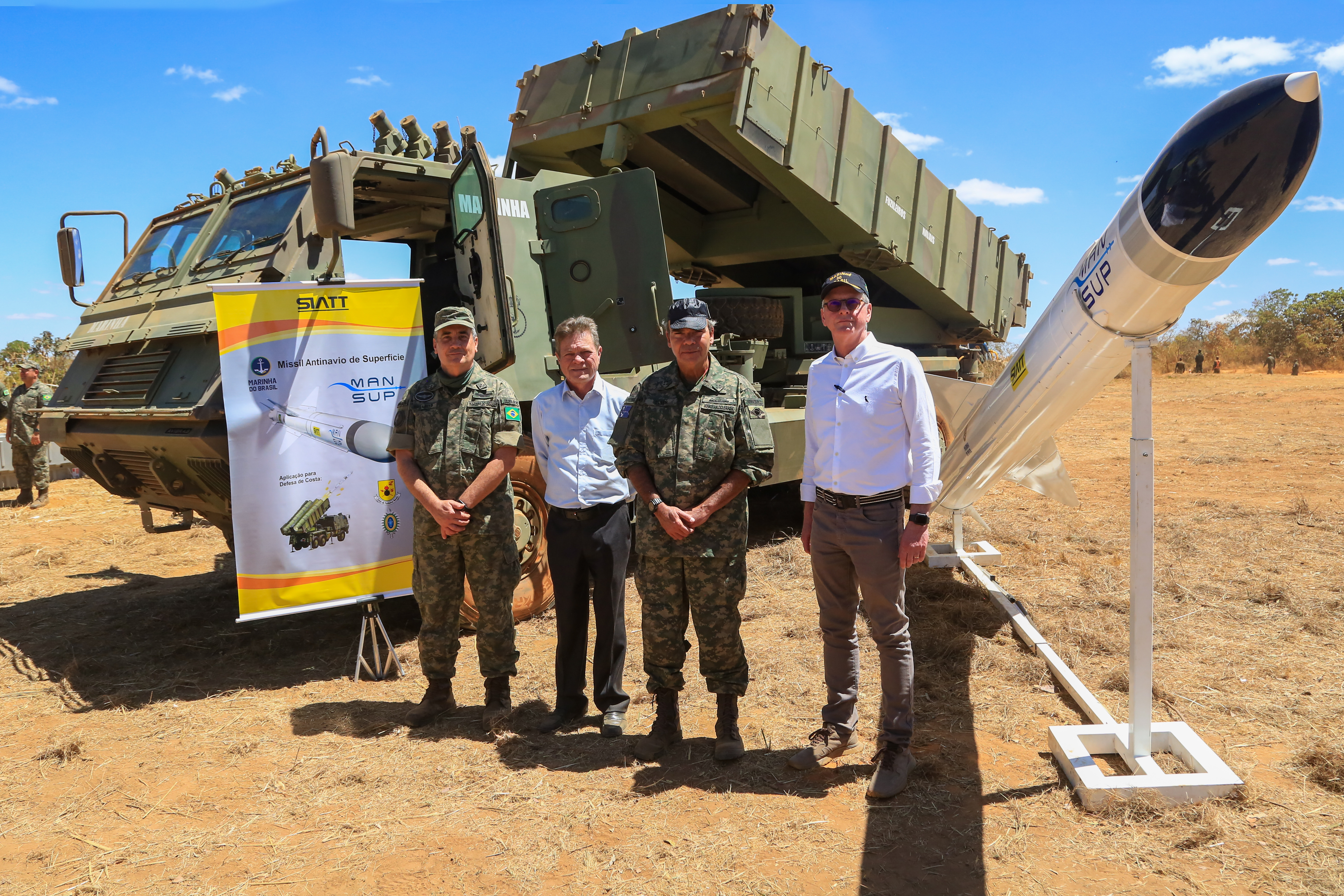
MANSUP with an ASTROS system

In October 2024, SIATT announced the integration of the missile with the multiple rocket launcher Astros II as a coastal battery variant. The first test launch was conducted with an ASTROS system of the Brazilian Marine Corps, at the Restinga da Marambaia test center on 17 December 2024.

On 20 February 2025, during the International Defence Exhibition, SIATT, the EDGE Group and the Brazilian Navy signed accords to a joint development of a broader range of surface-to-air (SAM) and land-attack (LAM) missiles based on MANSUP technologies.

On 4 April 2025, an agreement between the Turkish company Kale Jet Engines and SIATT was signed for the supply of Kale KTJ-3200 turbojet engines for use on the MANSUP-ER variant. KTJ-3200 is currently in use with Atmaca anti-ship missile and SOM cruise missile.

On 23 February 2026, the Brazilian Navy and SIATT, signed an agreement to develop the air-to-surface (ASM) variant of MANSUP.

Between 24–26 June 2026, the Brazilian Navy conducted the eighth test launch of the missile from the frigate Defensora (F41), testing the maximum range of MANSUP.

== Variants ==
- MANSUP: original anti-ship missile (AShM) with a maximum range of 70 km.
- MANSUP-ER: extended range turbofan powered anti-ship missile (AShM) with a maximum range of 200 km.
- MSA: shipboard SHORAD; development revealed in 2025.
- MAS: land-attack cruise missile (LAM); development revealed in 2025.
- MARSUP: air-to-surface missile (ASM); development contract signed in 2026.

== Operators ==
Brazil

- Tamandaré-class frigate
- Astros II multiple rocket launcher

United Arab Emirates

- Abu Dhabi-class corvette
