= Rheinmetall Sea Snake 30 mm =

Type of close-in weapon system

- Type: CIWS
- Place of origin: Switzerland

Service history
- In service: 2025
- Used by: Brazilian Navy; Swedish Amphibious Corps

Production history
- Designed: 2021
- Manufacturer: Rheinmetall Air Defence

Specifications
- Mass: Gun: 479 kg
- Length: 2.89 m
- Width: 1.91 m
- Height: 1.28 m
- Crew: unmanned
- Shell: 30×173mm
- Caliber: 30 mm
- Barrels: Singular
- Elevation: -25 / +60 degrees rate: 90 degree/s
- Traverse: 360 degrees rate: 120 degrees per second
- Rate of fire: Single shot Burst (automatic fire): 1,100 rounds per minute
- Muzzle velocity: 1,050 m/s (3,400 ft/s)

The Rheinmetall Sea Snake 30 mm is a close-in weapon system designed by Rheinmetall Air Defence AG for mounting on ships. It is based on the KCE30 30 mm revolver cannon, and was designed by a request of the German Navy. It is capable of employment of air burst ammunition (ABM). The launch customer of the system is the Brazilian Navy with the Tamandaré-class frigates.

In addition to standard types of ammunition, it is capable of firing 30 mm x 173 mm Air Burst Munitions (ABM) giving it the ability to engage drones. It has a self-stabilized sensor system equipped with day cameras and a cooled infrared sensor for use at night as well as two laser rangefinders.

== Users ==
Brazil

- Tamandaré-class frigate

Sweden

- CB90 – Ship class Combat Boats, together with the Hensoldt Spexer 2000 3D MK III Naval radar system

=== Future operators ===
Germany
