= STIR (radar) =

Fire-control radar system

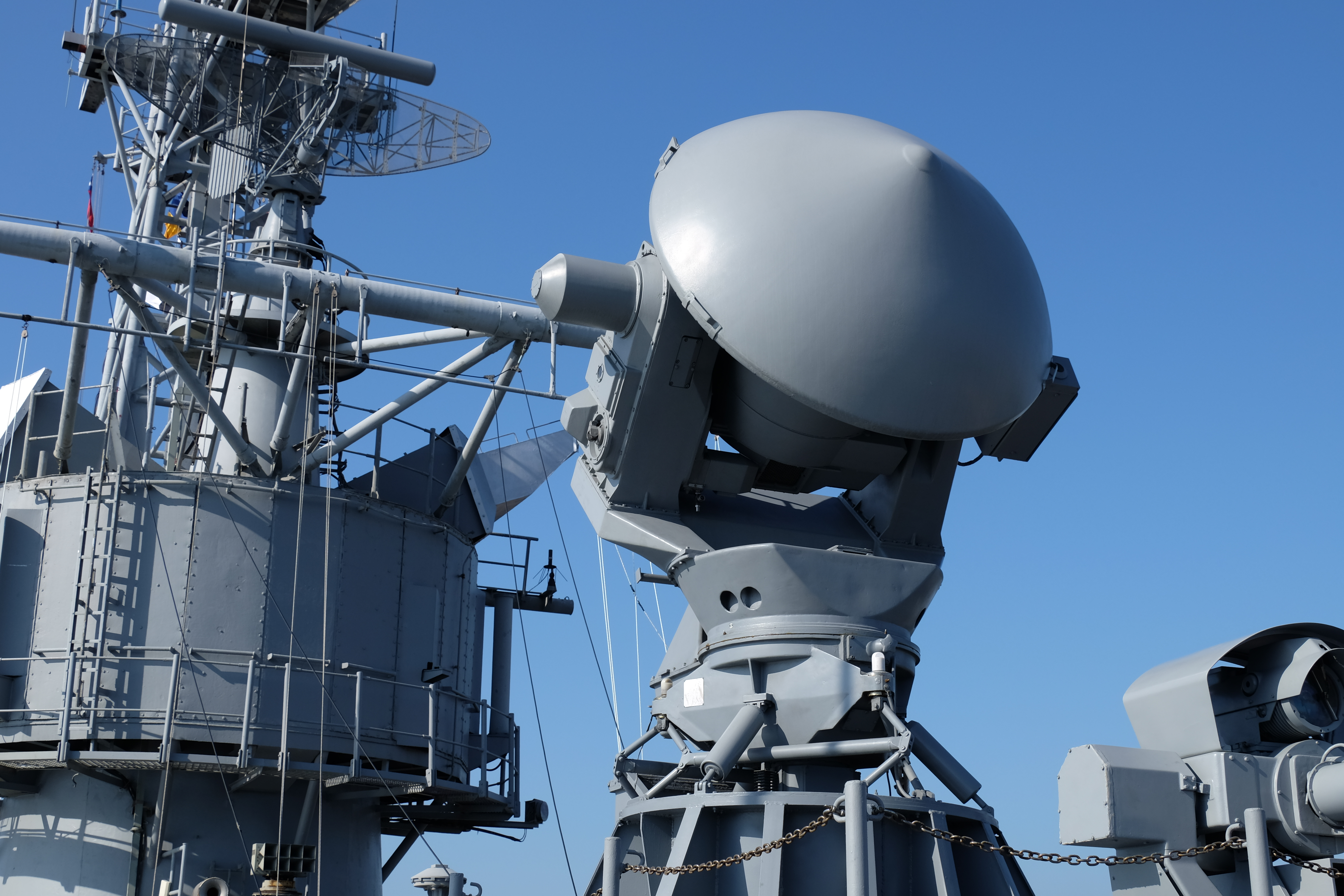
- STIR-1.8
- Country of origin: Netherlands
- Type: Radar tracker
- Frequency: X/K band
- PRF: 1,800 / 3,600 pps
- Beamwidth: 1.4 degree（X-band） 0.3 degree（K-band）
- Pulsewidth: 0.29 micro second
- Power: 220 kW（X-band） 20 kW（K-band）

STIR (Signal Tracking and Illumination Radar) is a medium-to-long range fire-control radar system manufactured by Thales Group. It is used for electro-optical tracking and missile illumination.

== Model ==
Model	Antenna	Radar	EO	Transmitter	Source
STIR 1.2 EO	Cassegrain 1.2 m	I-band, K-band	BW/Color/Infrared/Laser	Solid State	
STIR 1.8	1.8 m				
STIR 2.4 HP	Cassegrain 2.4 m	I-band	BW/Infrared	125kW TWT	

== Operators ==
- Argentina
- Brazil
- Belgium
- Chile
- Egypt
- Germany
- Greece
- Indonesia
- South Korea
- Netherlands
- Nigeria
- Peru
- Portugal
- Taiwan
- Turkey

== See also ==
- 2018 Japan–South Korea radar lock-on dispute – Japan alleged a South Korean navy destroyer irradiated a Japanese maritime patrol aircraft with STIR 1.8.
