= Caterpillar C32 =

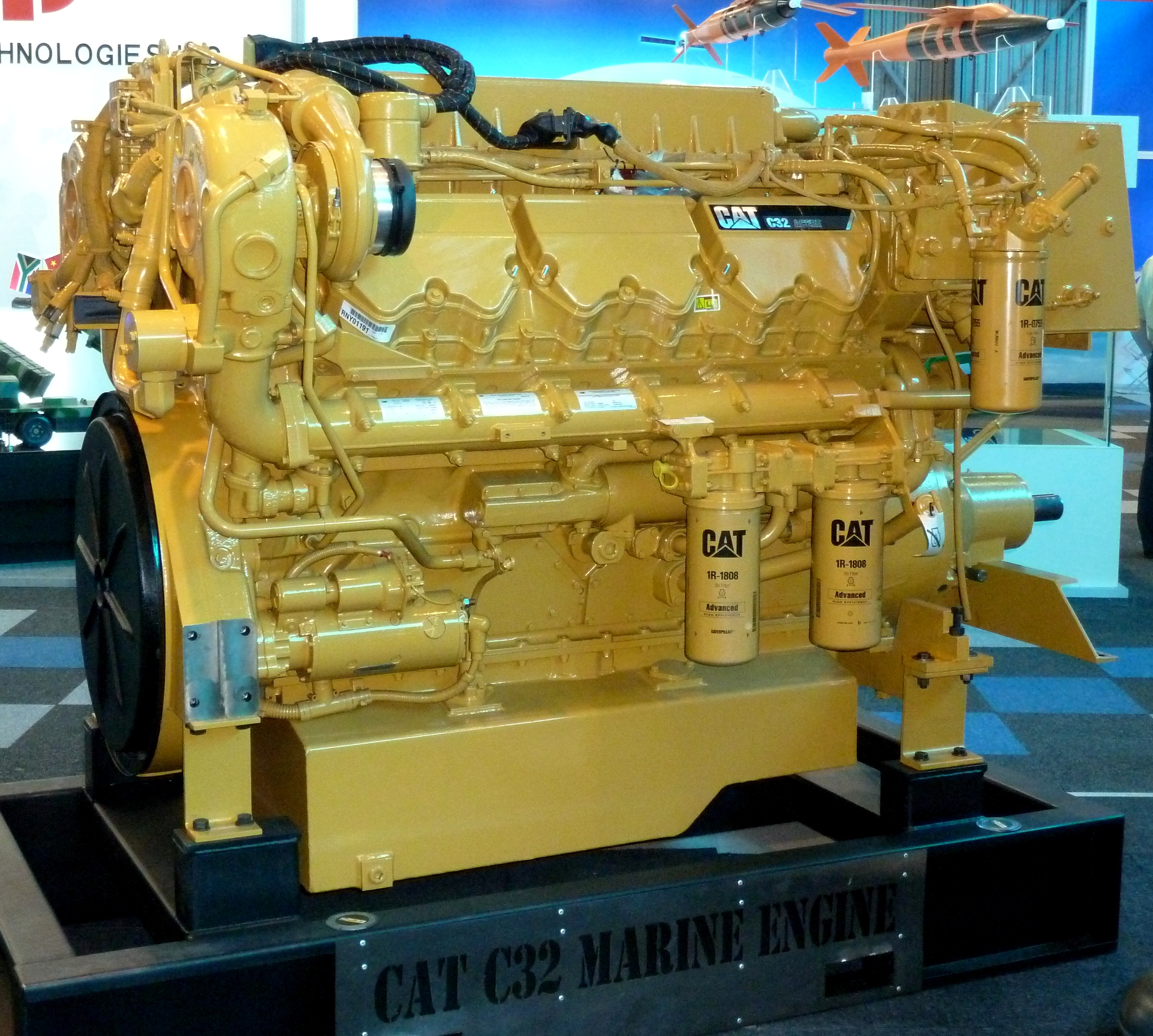
- Caterpillar C32 engine

Overview
- Manufacturer: Caterpillar Inc.
- Production: 2006-

Layout
- Configuration: Four-stroke V12
- Displacement: 32,100 cubic centimetres (1,959 in^{3})
- Cylinder bore: 145 millimetres (5.709 in)
- Piston stroke: 162 millimetres (6.378 in)
- Cylinder block material: Iron
- Cylinder head material: Iron
- Compression ratio: 15.3:1

RPM range
- Idle speed: 545
- Max. engine speed: 2350

Combustion
- Turbocharger: Twin turbocharged
- Fuel system: Unit injection (see management)
- Management: Electronic (ACERT) with mechanical failsafe
- Fuel type: Diesel
- Oil system: Wet sump
- Cooling system: Water cooled

Output
- Power output: 1,491 kilowatts (1,999 hp) @ 2200 rpm (marine/military rating)
- Torque output: 7,500 newton-metres (5,532 lbf⋅ft) @ 1300-1800 rpm

Dimensions
- Dry weight: 3,145 kilograms (6,934 lb)

Emissions
- Emissions target standard: EPA T4, Euro V or IMO 3
- Emissions control systems: Exhaust gas recirculation; Selective catalytic reduction

Chronology
- Predecessor: Caterpillar 3400 series engine
- Successor: Caterpillar C32B

The Caterpillar C32 is a V12 diesel engine made by Caterpillar Inc. The engine displacement is 32.1 liters (1959 cubic inches). The cylinder size is 5.71 inches x 6.38 inches bore/stroke. The engine can produce up to 1900 horsepower at 2300 rpm. The peak torque of 5532 lb-ft occurs at an engine speed of 1300 to 1800 RPM. The engine weighs over three tons at 6780 pounds. The C32 is used in CAT mining equipment including the 777G mining truck and the D11T bulldozer. It is also sold for use in rail and marine applications, and for other industrial applications such as power generation. The engine has been found to carry a mean time between failures of over 1200 hours and a reliability rating of 95% in a marine environment.

== Caterpillar C32B ==
Caterpillar C32B

Overview
- Manufacturer: Caterpillar Inc.
- Production: 2020-present

Layout
- Configuration: Four-stroke V12
- Displacement: 32,100 cubic centimetres (1,959 in^{3})
- Cylinder bore: 145 millimetres (5.709 in)
- Piston stroke: 162 millimetres (6.378 in)
- Valvetrain: DOHC
- Compression ratio: 15.3:1

RPM range
- Idle speed: 545
- Max. engine speed: 2400

Combustion
- Turbocharger: Quad
- Fuel system: Unit injection (see management)
- Management: Electronic (ACERT) with mechanical failsafe
- Fuel type: Diesel
- Oil system: Wet sump
- Cooling system: Water cooled

Output
- Power output: 1,805 kilowatts (2,421 hp; 2,454 PS) @ 2400 rpm (marine/military rating)
- Torque output: 7,500 newton-metres (5,532 lbf⋅ft) @ 1300-2400 rpm

Dimensions
- Dry weight: 3,400 kilograms (7,500 lb)

Emissions
- Emissions target standard: EPA T3, Euro III or IMO 2
- Emissions control systems: Exhaust gas recirculation; Selective catalytic reduction

Chronology
- Predecessor: Caterpillar C32

The Caterpillar C32B is a V12 diesel engine made by Caterpillar Inc. The engine displacement is 32.1 liters (1959 cubic inches). It is normally painted in grey. The cylinder size is 5.71 inches x 6.38 inches bore/stroke. The C32B is the most power-dense high-speed diesel engine (Note: To see what speed range is considered high speed, see:High-speed diesel engine.) of Caterpillar. The engine can produce up to 2433 marine horsepower at 2300 rpm. The peak torque of 5532 lb-ft occurs at an engine speed of 1300 to 1800 RPM. The engine has an iron block, painted in grey. The engine weighs over three tons at 7500 pounds.

The C32B was initially released with a marine-focused construction in 2020. Another variant designed for heavy equipment such as cranes, drills, and haulers was released in 2025.
