= Navio Patrulha de 500 Toneladas =

Brazilian class of patrol vessel

Class overview
- Name: Navio Patrulha de 500 Toneladas
- Builders: Arsenal de Marinha do Rio de Janeiro
- Operators: Brazilian Navy
- Preceded by: Macaé class
- Cost: US$64 million per ship
- Planned: 11

General characteristics
- Type: Offshore patrol vessel
- Tonnage: 498 t (490 long tons; 549 short tons)
- Length: 58.9 m (193 ft 3 in)
- Beam: 6 m (19 ft 8 in)
- Draught: 2.5 m (8 ft 2 in)
- Speed: 22.3 knots (41.3 km/h; 25.7 mph)
- Range: 3,000 nmi (5,600 km; 3,500 mi) at 15 knots (28 km/h; 17 mph)
- Complement: 43
- Armament: 1 × Bofors Mk4 40 mm; 2 × Oerlikon GAM-BO1 20 mm
- Notes: Sources:

The Navio Patrulha de 500 Toneladas (NPa-500MB) are a planned class of offshore patrol vessels for the Brazilian Navy, to be built under the management of EMGEPRON. A total of eleven units are planned, including three for mine countermeasures. All the vessels are planned for delivery by 2037.
