= Austrian Air Force =

Air warfare branch of Austria's military

- Österreichische Luftstreitkräfte
- Austrian Air Force roundel
- Active: 1927–1938; 1955–present
- Country: Austria
- Type: Air force
- Size: 4,300 personnel 94 aircraft
- Part of: Austrian Armed Forces
- Headquarters: Rossauer Barracks, Vienna
- Website: bundesheer.at

Aircraft flown
- Fighter: Eurofighter Typhoon
- Helicopter: AW169, AB212, OH-58, Sikorsky S-70
- Trainer: Diamond DA40 NG, Pilatus PC-7
- Transport: C-130, Pilatus PC-6

The Austrian Air Force (German: Österreichische Luftstreitkräfte, lit. 'Austrian Air Combat Force') is a component part of the Austrian Armed Forces.

== History ==
The Austrian Air Force in its current form was created in May 1955 by the victorious Allied powers, subject to restrictions on its use of guided missiles. The Austrian State Treaty of 1955 committed Austria to permanent neutrality.

Pilot training started with four Yak-11 Moose and four Yak-18 Max aircraft donated by the Soviet Union, and Austria purchased further light trainer types under the Military Assistance Program. Until 1960 Austria purchased training and support aircraft under the MAP, but no modern fighter aircraft; the role of a fighter was rather inadequately filled by 30 of the already outdated Saab 29 Tunnan bought second-hand from the Swedish Air Force in the early 1960s.

From 1970, Austria purchased a total of 40 Saab 105 lightweight multi-role aircraft with the intention to deploy them in trainer, reconnaissance, interception and ground attack roles. As it became clear in the 1980s that the sub-sonic aircraft were inadequate for air combat and airspace interdiction, Austria purchased 28 reconditioned Saab 35 Draken fighter aircraft to supersede the Saab 105 as the Austrian Air Force's main interceptor in 1988. The Saab 105 remained in service as a trainer/surveillance aircraft.

Shortly after, the Draken saw their first major use in airspace interdiction starting in 1991 during the Yugoslav Wars, when Yugoslav MiG-21 fighters crossed the Austrian border without permission. In one incident on 28 June, a MiG-21 penetrated as far as Graz, causing widespread demands for action. Following repeated border crossings by armed aircraft of the Yugoslav People's Army, changes were suggested to the standing orders for aircraft armament.

Since 1955, Austria's armed forces had been forbidden to operate any guided missile system, including air-to-air missiles and surface-to-air missiles (SAMs). In the post-Cold War environment, and with gun-armed aircraft a relic of a past age, the Austrian Parliament voted to amend this section of its state treaty and in January 1993 modern AIM-9 Sidewinder missiles were ordered from Sweden to arm its fighter aircraft. A higher performance model of the Sidewinder was purchased directly from the United States; deliveries began in 1995. French Mistral SAMs were purchased to add ground-based protection against air attack. The first Mistrals arrived in 1993 and final deliveries were concluded in 1996.

The helicopter fleet has included Agusta-Bell (AB) 204s (mainly used for medical evacuation), AB-206s (training and liaison), and AB-212s (used by air-mobile troops and for light transport). 28 French-made Alouette IIIs were used for search-and-rescue tasks, including high mountain operations. The Bell OH-58 Kiowa, a scout helicopter, is mounted with a rapid-firing machine gun, but the air force lacks a true attack helicopter. Most of the helicopters mentioned above, except the AB-212s, are becoming obsolete or have already been retired. After the 1999 Galtür Avalanche, it became apparent that the Austrian Air Force's helicopter complement were too few in numbers and too limited in design. Therefore, 9 US-built UH-60 Blackhawk helicopters were purchased, to be used for transportation during disasters.

In 2003 Austria's transport capability was improved when it purchased three C-130 Hercules from the Royal Air Force. These aircraft were needed for the demanding UN peacekeeping missions in which Austria played a role. One of which was retired in 2025, and the others will be retired in 2027 and 2030, being replaced by four C-390 aircraft.

In 2005, the Saab Draken fleet was retired (50 years after the type first flew), to be replaced by the Eurofighter Typhoon. Before the first delivery of Typhoons, 12 F-5 Tiger II were leased from Switzerland as a stopgap measure. The Eurofighter purchase was subject to controversy in Austria, and became a political football for some time, but the 15th and final aircraft was delivered on 24 September 2009. As of 2017, possible corruption affairs surrounding the Eurofighter procurement were still being investigated by the Austrian parliament. In July 2017, as a result of the ongoing controversy, the Austrian Ministry of Defense announced the phasing out of the Typhoon starting in 2020, and its replacement by a "militarily more effective and more cost-efficient" air surveillance system; however, this plan was never executed due to budget cuts and COVID-19, with plans instead to replace the Typhoons with upgraded variants.

== Organization ==
Austria's air force is divided into two brigade-level formations: the Air Surveillance Command (Kommando Luftraumüberwachung) in Salzburg tasked with the defense of the Austrian airspace and the Air Support Command (Kommando Luftunterstützung) in Hörsching Air Base with helicopters and transport planes.

- Air Surveillance Command, Salzburg
  - Airspace Surveillance Wing, Zeltweg Air Base
    - Fighter Squadron 1, (Eurofighter Typhoon jets)
    - Fighter Squadron 2, (Eurofighter Typhoon jets)
  - Radar Battalion, Salzburg
  - Air Defense Battalion 2, Zeltweg
  - Air Defense Bataillon 8, Salzburg

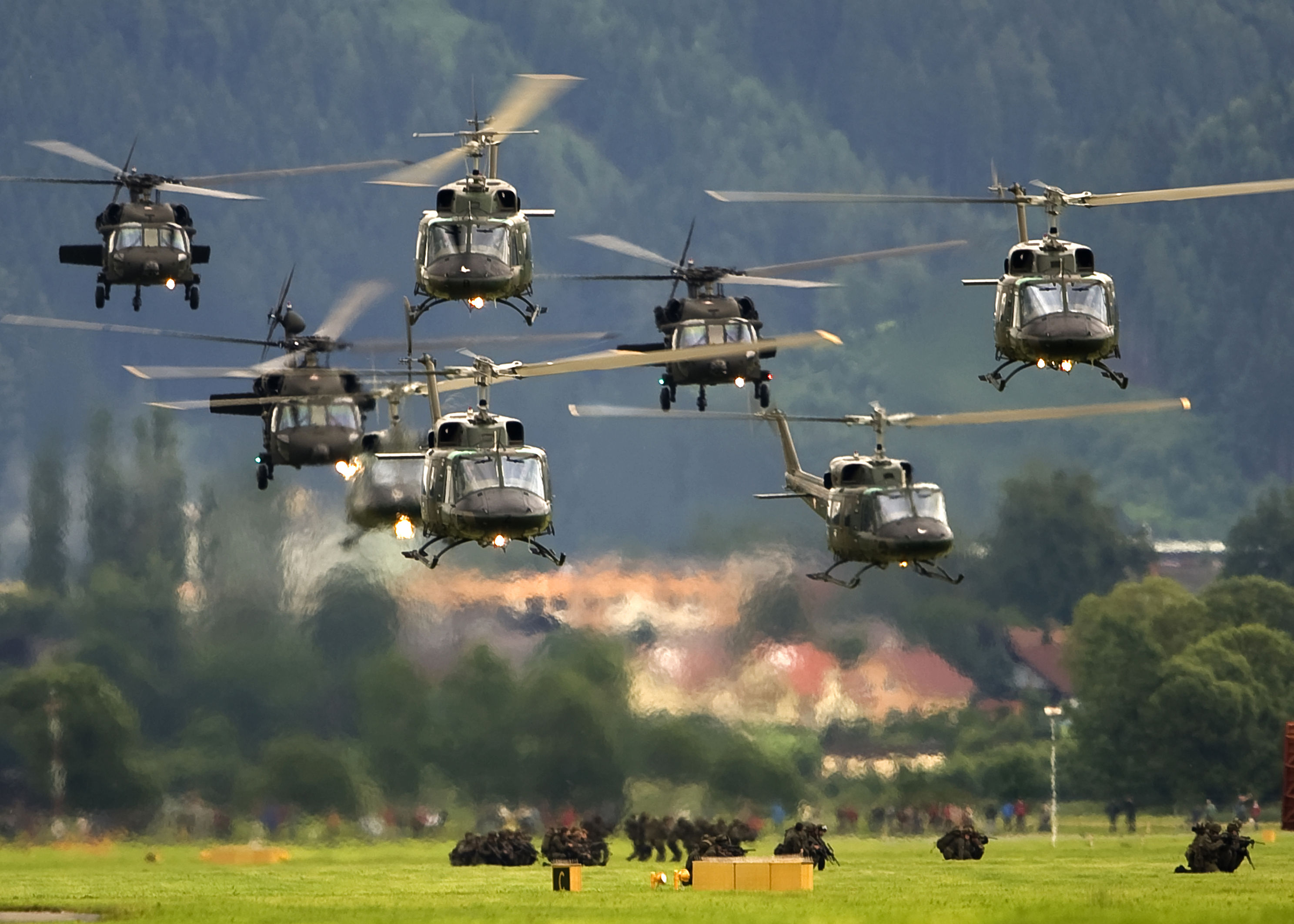
Austrian Air Force rappelling exercise from military helicopters

  - Maintenance Facility 2, Zeltweg Air Base
- Air Support Command, Hörsching Air Base
  - Air Support Wing, Langenlebarn Air Base
    - Medium Transport Helicopter Squadron, (9x S-70A-42 Black Hawk helicopters)
    - Light Utility Helicopter Squadron, (10x OH-58B Kiowa helicopters)
    - Light Air Transport Squadron, (8x PC-6 Porter planes)
    - Air Reconnaissance Squadron, (various Unmanned aerial vehicles)
  - Liaison Helicopter Squadron, Aigen im Ennstal
  - Light Transport Helicopter Squadron 1, Hörsching Air Base (11x AB 212 helicopters)
  - Light Transport Helicopter Squadron 2, Hörsching Air Base (11x AB 212 helicopters)
  - Air Transport Squadron, Hörsching Air Base (3x C-130K Hercules planes)
  - Maintenance Facility 1, Langenlebarn Air Base
  - Maintenance Facility 3, Hörsching Air Base

All personnel destined to enter service with the Air Force are trained by the Air and Air Defense Personnel School (Flieger- und Fliegerabwehrtruppenschule) based at Langenlebarn Air Base. The school is under direct command and control of the Ministry of Defense and controls two flying units:

- Airplane Training Squadron, Zeltweg Air Base (12x PC-7 planes)
- Helicopter Training Squadron, Langenlebarn Air Base

After 50 years of service the Austrian Air Force retired without replacement its Saab 105OE aircraft in January 2021 and disbanded its Jet Trainer Squadron (Düsentrainerstaffel) at Linz - Hörsching Air Base, which operated the type. The Squadron's younger pilots re-qualified for the Eurofighter, the older pilots and the aircraft technicians re-qualified for the AB 212 helicopters and advanced jet flying training was outsourced to the Italian Air Force's MB.339 and T.346 jet trainers operating from Lecce - Galatina and Decimomannu.

=== Air Force locations ===
Main locations of the Austrian Air Force in 2018:
Air Base
Selex RAT-31DL Radar Station
Radar Battalion with mobile radars
Command and Control Center "Basisraum"

=== Air bases ===
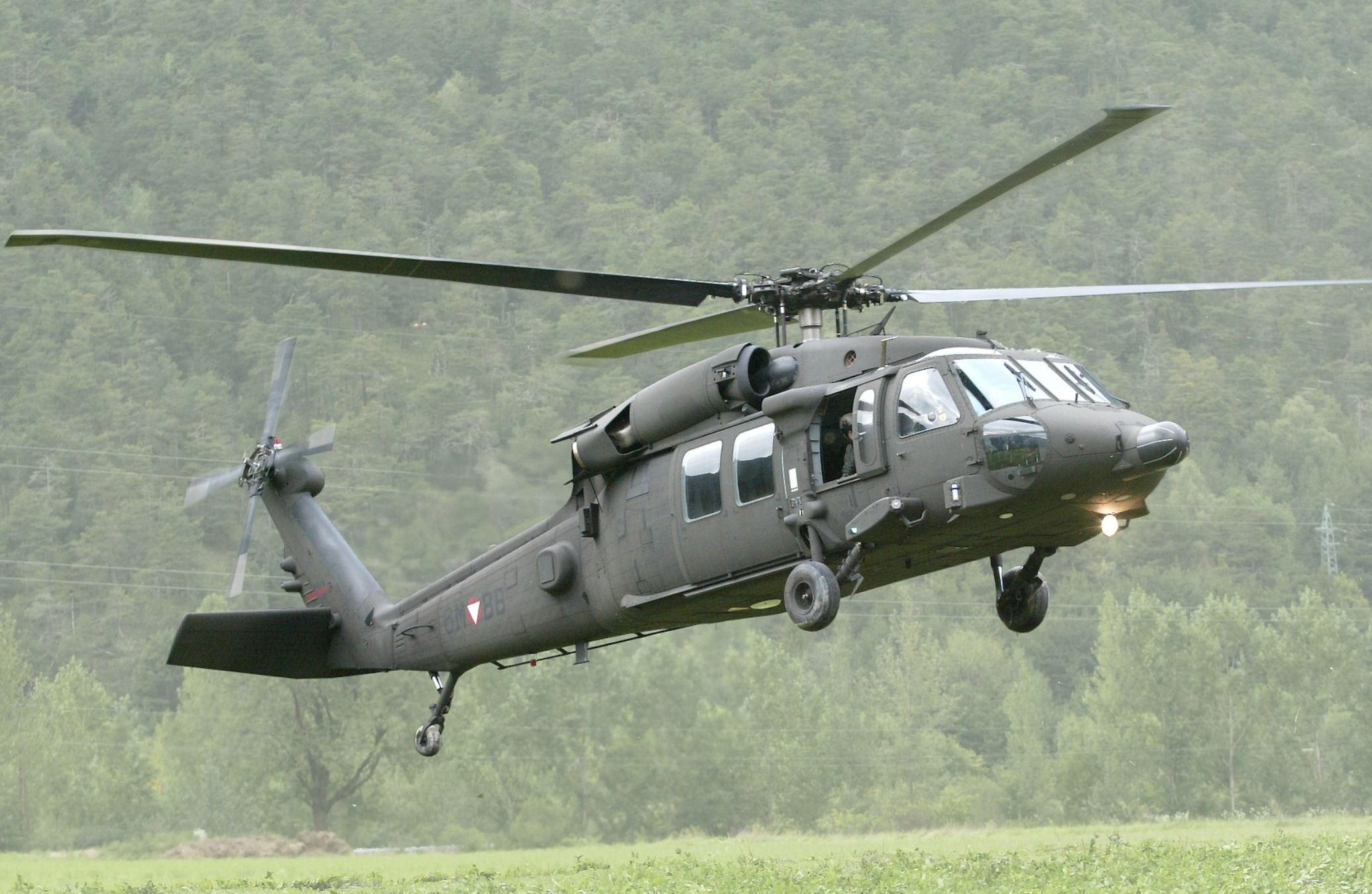
Austrian Air Force S-70A42 landing in Paznaun valley, Austria

Eight air bases (Fliegerhorste) are maintained by the Austrian Air Force.

Vogler Air Base

Vogler Air Base, north of the town of Hörsching west of Linz, was built as a base for the German Luftwaffe 1938–1940. After the war the USAAF used the base, then named "Camp McCauley – Hörsching" and housing displaced persons, until 1955 when it was returned to the Austrian government.

Initially used exclusively by the ground forces, the first military aircraft, Yak-18 "Max-A", arrived in 1957. The base was named for First Lieutenant Walter Vogler in 1967.

The German-built base structures were used jointly by the military and civilian aviation until the 70s when construction of the new civilian area in the northern part of the base was finished.

FH Vogler is the largest base of the Luftstreitkräfte. It houses Fliegerwerft 3, responsible for overhauls and maintenance of the C-130K Hercules and AB-212.

Units currently based here are the C-130K Hercules of 4th Air Transport Squadron, Flight Regiment 3; and the AB-212 of 1st and 2nd Helicopter Squadron, Flight Regiment 3.

Figl-Pabisch Air Base

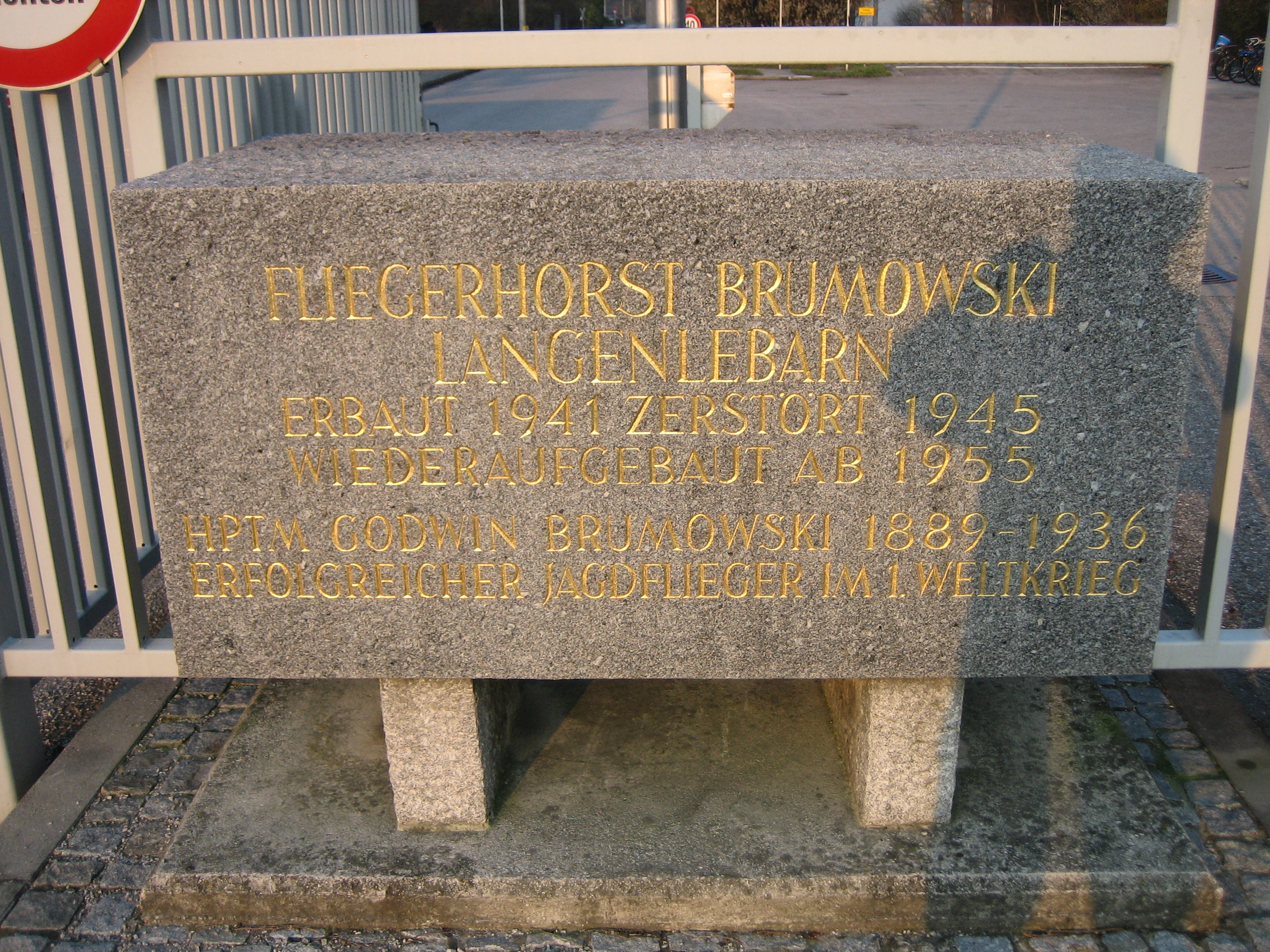
Main gate of FH Brumowski

Figl Air Base (until 2024 Fliegerhorst Brumowski), south of the town of Langenlebarn northwest of Vienna, was built as a base for the Luftwaffe 1938–1940. After the war the base was briefly occupied by Soviet troops before it was taken over by the USAAF, becoming "Air Force Station Tulln – Vienna". In 1946 Pan Am added the base as a destination, and for a short time there were regular flights New York City/Langenlebarn.

The first Austrian aircraft to arrive were Yak-11 "Moose" and Yak-18 "Max-A" trainers donated by the Soviet Union and Agusta Bell AB47G2 helicopters in late 1955. The base was named for Captain Godwin Brumowski in 1967. In 2024 the airbase was renamed to Fliegerhorst Leopold Figl - Flugplatz General Pabisch

The base is the headquarters of the Luftunterstützungsgeschwader (Air Support Wing); it also houses the Bundesfachschule für Flugtechnik (Federal School for Aeronautical Engineering) and Fliegerwerft 1, responsible for overhauls and maintenance of the Pilatus PC-6 B2H2 Turbo Porter, S-70A-42 Black Hawk and OH-58B Kiowa.

Units currently based here are the PC-6 B2H2 Turbo Porter of 4th Air Squadron, Flight Regiment 1; the S-70A-42 Black Hawk of 1st Helicopter Squadron, Flight Regiment 1, and OH-58B Kiowa of 3rd Helicopter Squadron, Flight Regiment 1.

Hinterstoisser Air Base

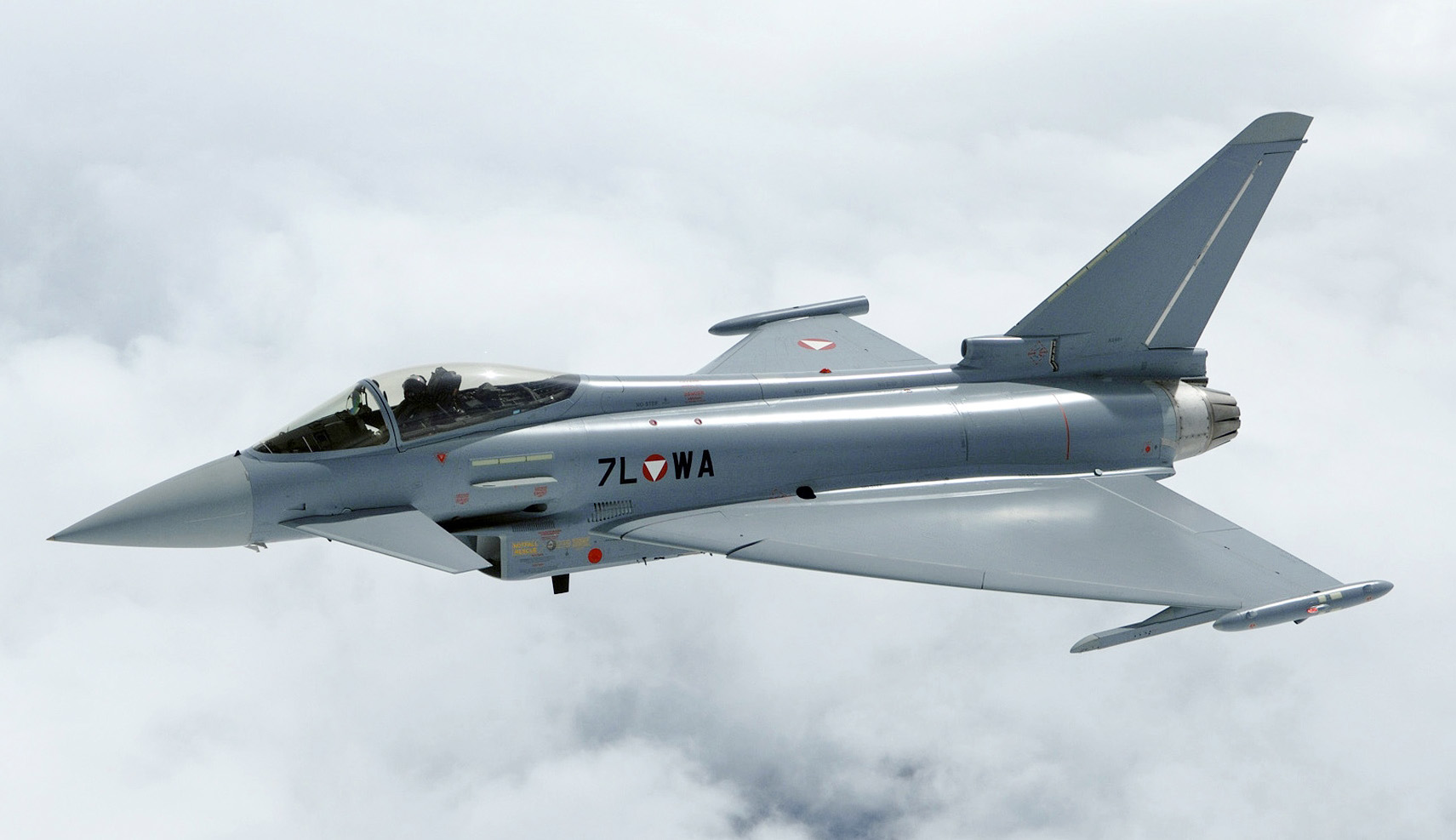
Austrian Eurofighter flies over Fliegerhorst Hinterstoisser field

Fliegerhorst Hinterstoisser, located north of Zeltweg in a region known as Aichfeld, was built as a base for the Air Force of the Ständestaat 1936–1938. The base was occupied by Soviet troops in the aftermath of the war, but then transferred to the RAF which used the base until 1947.

In spring 1957 the first aircraft, Piper PA-18/95 Super Cub and Zlin Z-126 Trener, arrived with Fluggruppe 1 at the base. Since then it is the main base for the training of new aviators. It was named for Colonel Franz Hinterstoisser in 1967.

The base houses the 1st Squadron of the Überwachungsgeschwader (Surveillance Wing). With the retirement of the Saab 35 Draken in 2005 the unit now uses the Eurofighter Typhoon. The first Eurofighter Typhoon arrived in July 2007. The base also houses parts of Fliegerwerft 2, responsible for overhauls and maintenance of the Saab 105OE and the Pilatus PC-7 Turbo Trainer, as well as flight school for basic training.

Units currently based here are the PC-7 Turbo Trainer of flight school; detachments of 2nd Squadron and the Eurofighter Typhoon.

Fiala-Fernbrugg Air Base

Fiala-Fernbrugg Air Base (Fliegerhorst Fiala-Fernbrugg), located north of the town of Aigen im Ennstal on the southern edge of the Totes Gebirge, was built as a base for the Air Force of the Ständestaat 1936–37. At the end of World War II the base became the home base of the only helicopter unit of the Luftwaffe; beginning the tradition of helicopter operations at Aigen im Ennstal.

Soviet troops occupied the base after the war, but after only a few weeks control switched to US forces. After a few more weeks, the base ended up in British hands. The RAF rebuilt the base and handed it over to Austria in 1947. It was used as a storage depot for the B-Gendarmerie, a paramilitary police force in the western zones.
After some years of hiatus, the first helicopters, Bell H-13H Sioux arrived in late 1960. The base was named for Captain Benno Fiala von Fernbrugg in 1967.

The base houses Fliegerwerft A, which was responsible for overhauls and maintenance on the AS-316B Alouette III. Hochgebirgslandekurse (Alpine landing courses) are conducted at least annually at the base, with officers of foreign air forces as regular attendants.

Units based here were the AS-316B Alouette III of 1st and 2nd Helicopter Squadron, Flight Regiment 2.

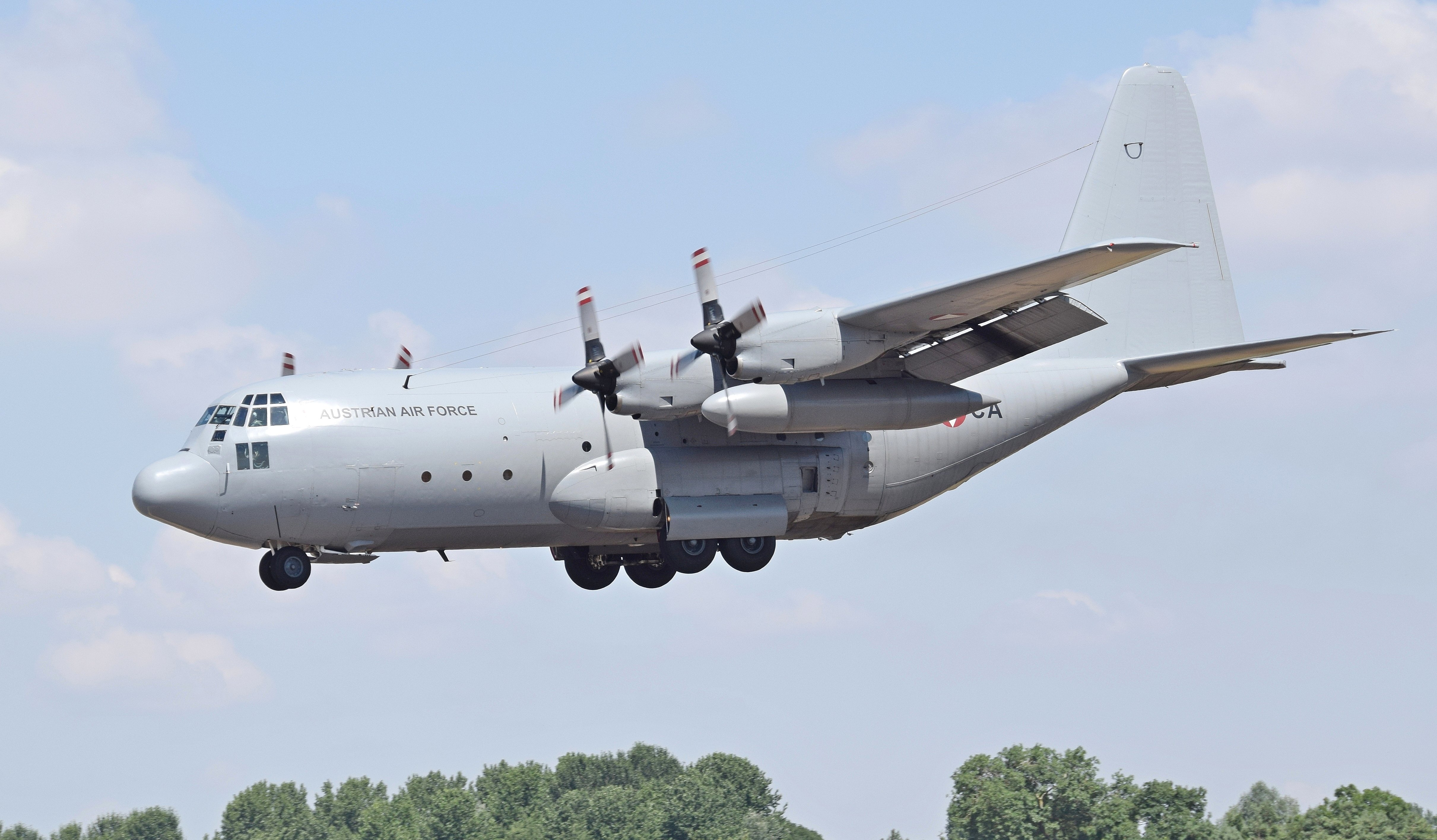
Lockheed C-130K Hercules (code 8T-CA) of the Austrian Air Force arriving at the 2018 RIAT, England

Wiener Neustadt Air Base

Wiener Neustadt Air Base was located northwest of the city and was one of the first airports on the European continent. It opened in 1910 and housed units of the Austro-Hungarian Imperial and Royal Aviation Troops. The base was close to the Wiener Neustädter Flugzeugwerke (WNF) factory in the eastern part of the city and which manufactured Messerschmitt Bf 109s and repaired Junkers bombers and destroyers during World War II. The base was bombed to total destruction during World War II and was rebuilt by the Soviets who operated the base until 1955. The Austrian military took the base over, but didn't use it until 1961. The base houses no units, but Flight Regiment 1's PC-6 B2H2 Turbo Porter are operating from the base for flight training purposes as well as for training of army parachutists.

Truppenübungsplatz Allentsteig – Liechtenstein Kaserne

The large Liechtenstein Kaserne on the northern edge of the Truppenübungsplatz Allentsteig (Training Area, Gunnery and Bombing Range) is home to a detachment of Flight Regiment 1's OH-58B Kiowas. Known as Stützpunkt Nord, it is not only used by military aircraft; helicopters of the Ministry of the Interior also use the base for operations; the task of border surveillance is jointly conducted by the military and civilian authorities. Besides that, Flight Regiment 1's helicopters and PC-6 B2H2 Turbo Porters are operating from the base or its adjacent meadows and roads on a regular basis.

Frundsberg Kaserne

The Frundsberg Kaserne in the southern suburbs of Schwaz east of Innsbruck housed a detachment of Flight Regiment 2's AS-316B Alouette IIIs used for SAR and firefighting duties. The helicopters were operating from Schwaz since 1969. The base is earmarked for closure, with the helicopters redeployed to the nearby Andreas Hofer Kaserne.

=== Air defense facilities ===
Radar installations sites for mobile air defense systems are also maintained by the Austrian Air Force.

Ortsfeste Radarstation Kolomannsberg – ORS K

This radar site is located atop the Kolomannsberg (1,114 m) on the border between Salzburg and Upper Austria north of Thalgau in a region known as the Flachgau. The site is active since January 1968, and provides 24/7 air surveillance since August 1968. Initially a French CSF (now Thales Group) RV376 and a British Marconi (now BAE Systems) S244 height finder were used at the site but were replaced by an Italian Selenia (now Alenia) RAT-31S 3D-radar in 1983. The system was further enhanced with the installation of a Selenia (now Alenia) RAT-31DL 3-D radar in 2003.

The site is also called Grossraumradarstation (lit. large space radar station) since it has the necessary office and working areas for a complete air traffic/combat control center. It served in this role until 1987 when its tasks were taken over by the EZ/B and is still maintained to provide backup when needed.

Ortsfeste Radarstation Speikkogel – ORS SPK

This radar site is located atop the Speikkogel (2,140 m) on the border between Styria and Carinthia in the Koralpe mountains west of Wolfsberg. The site is active since 1986, with its construction and commission severely hampered by the bad weather in the region (partly due to the height above SL) and problems with the radom and the radar itself. A Selenia (now Alenia) RAT-31S 3-D radar is installed, scheduled to receive the RAT-31DL upgrade. The site features a downsized version of the ORS K's control center, but is normally not staffed.

Ortsfeste Radarstation Steinmandl – ORS STM

This radar site is located atop the Steinmandl (490 m) north of Ernstbrunn in the Leiser Berge region 40 km north of Vienna. The site is active since 1985; to the immediate west a secondary radar operated by AustroControl is located atop the Buschberg. The ORS uses a Selenia (now Alenia) RAT-31S 3-D radar, but is scheduled to receive the RAT-31DL upgrade. The site was a replacement for the unbuilt one atop the Schneeberg south of Vienna.

=== Modernization and expansion of the Austrian jet fleet ===
==== Modernization and expansion of the Eurofighter fleet ====
In 2022, the Austrian Ministry of Defense announced that the entire Eurofighter fleet would be modernized. The currently 15 Eurofighters are to receive night vision, self-defence and medium-range missiles.

Furthermore, the purchase of further fighter jets is currently being examined.

==== Subsonic jets with light armament ====
It is very likely that Austria will announce the purchase of light jets with light armament (e.g. on-board cannon, unguided rockets...) in the first half of 2023. More detailed information regarding the type is not yet known.

== Aircraft ==
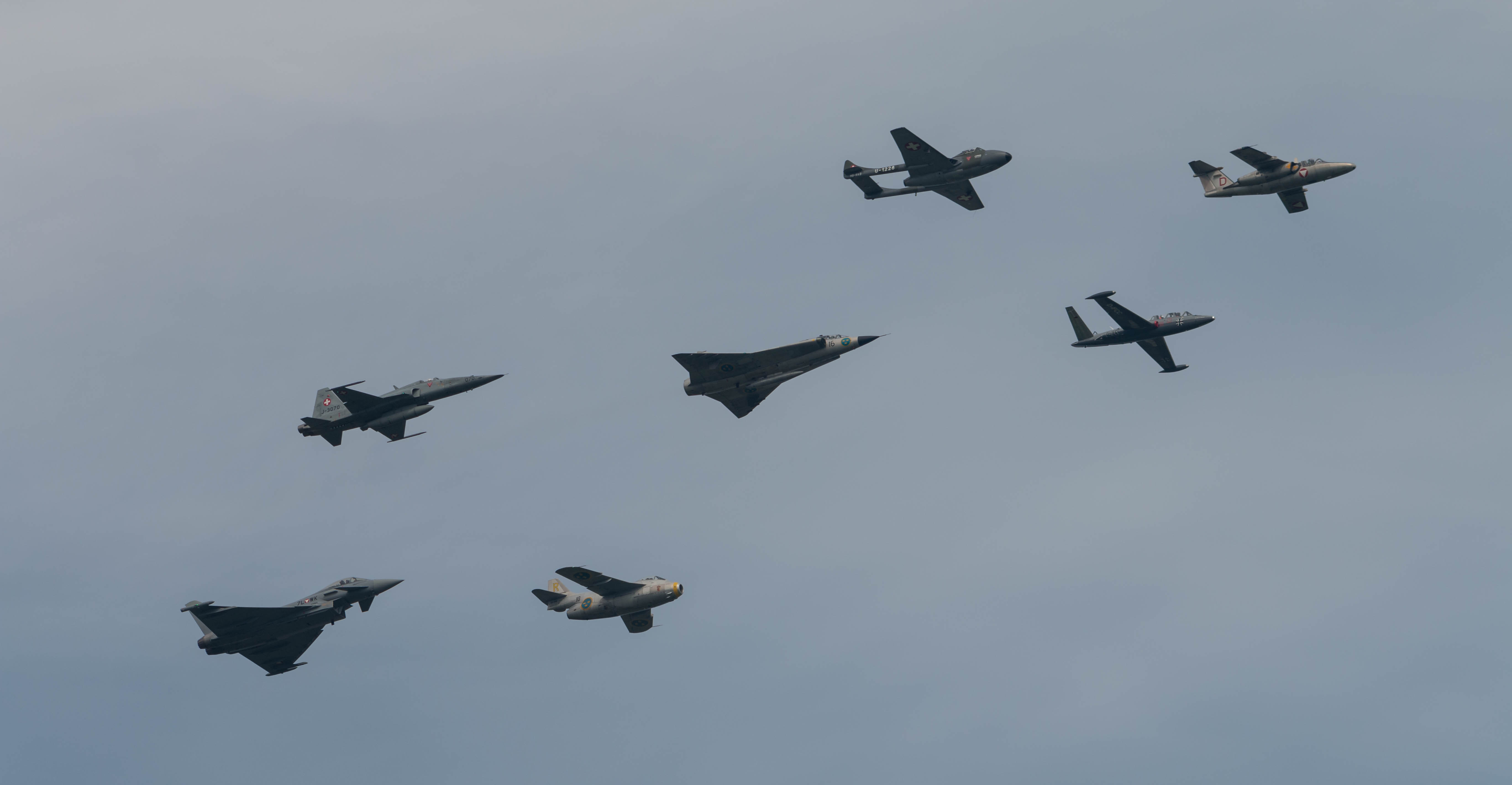
A number of jets used by the Austrian Air Force throughout history

=== Current inventory ===
Aircraft	Origin	Type	Variant	In service	Notes
Combat aircraft (15)
Eurofighter Typhoon	Multinational	Multirole	Tranche 1	15	The Austrian government has planned to replace the old T1 Eurofighters with 36 modern fighter jets.
Leonardo M-346 Master	Italy	Attack / Fighter	M-346FA	0	12 on order
Transport (10)
C-130 Hercules	United States	Tactical airlifter	C-130K	2	Three ex-Royal Air Force aircraft were purchased, one of which was retired in 2025.
Embraer C-390 Millennium	Brazil	Tactical airlifter	C-390	0	4 on order
Pilatus PC-6	Switzerland	Transport / Utility		8	
Helicopters (52)
AgustaWestland AW169	Italy	Utility	AW169M	11	According to World Air Forces 2026, these 11 are "trainer helicopters" (+1 on order) with 0 "combat helicopters" (+24 on order) in inventory. According to Kleine Zeitung, total 36 on order of AW169M (combat variant) and AW169B (training variant) helicopters. Can be armed with 12.7 mm cannon, unguided rockets, a laser-guided missile, a forward-looking infrared (FLIR) system, and an integrated weapons computer.
Agusta/Bell AB 212	United States	Utility		22	
Bell OH-58	United States	Attack	OH-58B	10	Is mounted with a machine gun. To be replaced by AW169.
Sikorsky UH-60 Black Hawk	United States	Utility	S-70A/UH-60M	9 (S-70A)	9 in service and 15 more ordered. 3 ex-Royal Jordanian Air Force S-70A and 12 new UH-60M on order.
Trainer aeroplanes (16)
Pilatus PC-7	Switzerland	Trainer		12	Can be armed with two 12.7 mm machine guns.
Diamond DA40	Austria	Trainer	DA40 NG	4	
Military UAV
MUAV		Medium-altitude long-endurance UAV			12 armed Medium-altitude long-endurance UAVs to enter in servive 2029.

== Air defense systems ==
=== Mobile MRCS-403 Systems ===
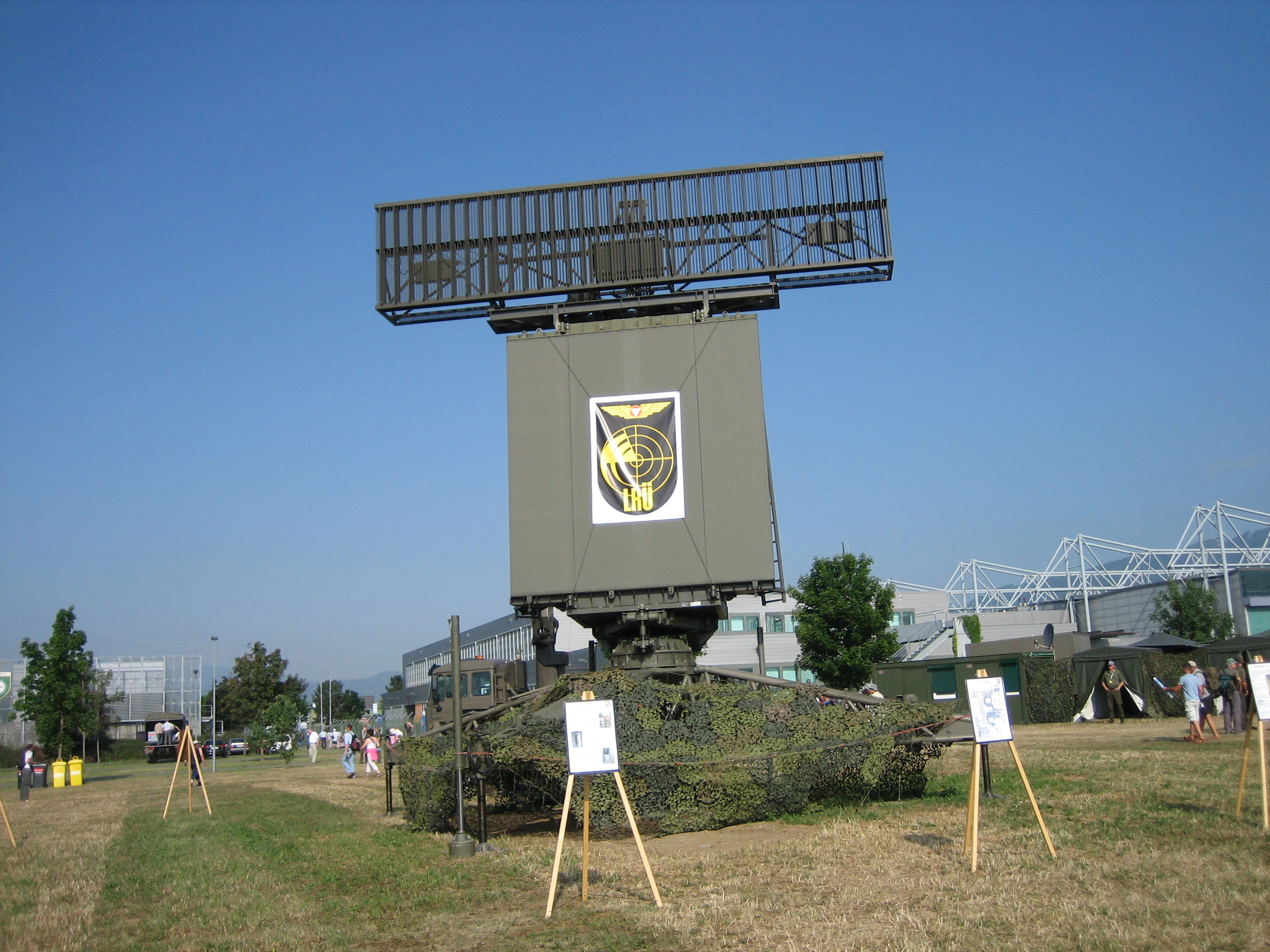
Alenia MRCS-403 at the AirPower 2005 airshow

As a backup to the fixed sites and to create a better situation image in times of crisis two Selenia (now Alenia) MRCS-403 3-D radars – mobile versions of the RAT-31S – are operated by the Radarbataillon since 1979. Several sites (Irrsberg, Hochwechsel) are prepared to host the radar.

=== Mobile RAC 3D Systems ===
To provide detection of low-flying aircraft the Radarbataillon operates six Thomson-CSF (now Thales Group) RAC 3D medium-range 3-D radars – designated TER Tieffliegererfassungsradar – mounted on ÖAF 32.403 trucks beginning in 1998. A further 16 of these systems are operated by the Air Defense Bataillons in special target designation configuration to provide early warning and target tracking for the Mistral units.

=== 35 mm Twin-barreled Anti-Air Gun Model 85 ===
The Z/FlAK 85 (Zwilling/Fliegerabwehrkanone) is the Oerlikon Contraves GDF-001 system. 18 of these guns were purchased in 1965 (under the designation Z/FlAK 65) and used with earlier acquired Oerlikon Contraves FLGer 60 (Feuerleitgerät, fire control radar) Super Fledermaus and new Oerlikon Contraves FLGer 65 Improved Super Fledermaus.

A second batch of these guns consisting of a further 18 Z/FlAK 65, but this time with FLGer 69, a further improved Super Fledermaus, was purchased in 1973. The FLGer 69 were never issued to the units but returned to the manufacturer in 1973 for eventual replacement with the new FLGer 75 Skyguard beginning in 1976. Improved Skyguards, dubbed FLGer 79 were purchased in 1981.

The guns itself were upgraded to GDF-005 standard in 1987, designated Z/FlAK 85 since. The FLGer 75/79 have been upgraded to FLGer 98 in the late 90s. A total of 72 guns and 37 Skyguard systems have been acquired over the years.

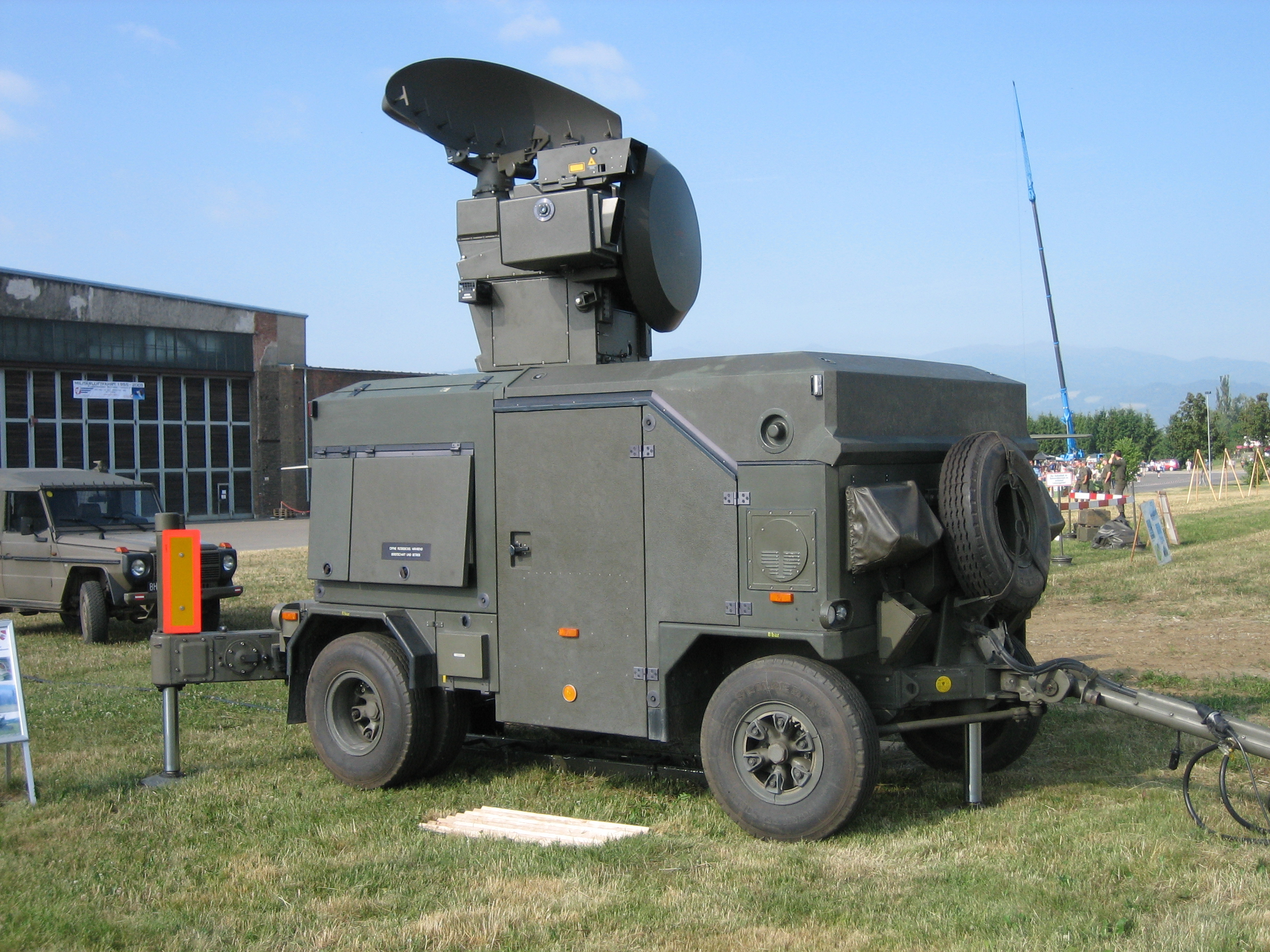
FLGer 98 at the AirPower 2005 airshow

=== Light Anti-Air Guided Missile Mistral ===
The lFAL (leichte Fliegerabwehrlenkwaffe) Matra (now MBDA) Mistral is not only used with the Air Defense Regiments of the Air Force, but also with the air defense batteries attached to the HQ units of the Army's Brigades. 72 of these systems – along with several hundred missiles, the exact number is unknown – have been purchased beginning in 1993. They are used in conjunction with the so-called ZZR (Zielzuweisungsradar), 16 Thomson-CSF (now Thales Group) RAC 3D medium range 3-D radars in target designation configuration which were purchased in 1998. Nine missile launchers and two radars normally operate in a battery.

=== Other Air Defence Systems ===
- 20 mm Light Anti-Air Gun Model 65/68, Oerlikon Contraves GAI-B01, retired
- 25 mm Anti-Air Gun Model 38/39, Model Hotchkiss, retired 1959
- 40 mm Anti-Air Gun Model 55/57, Model Bofors, retired late 70s

== Ranks ==
=== Commissioned officer ranks ===
The rank insignia of commissioned officers.

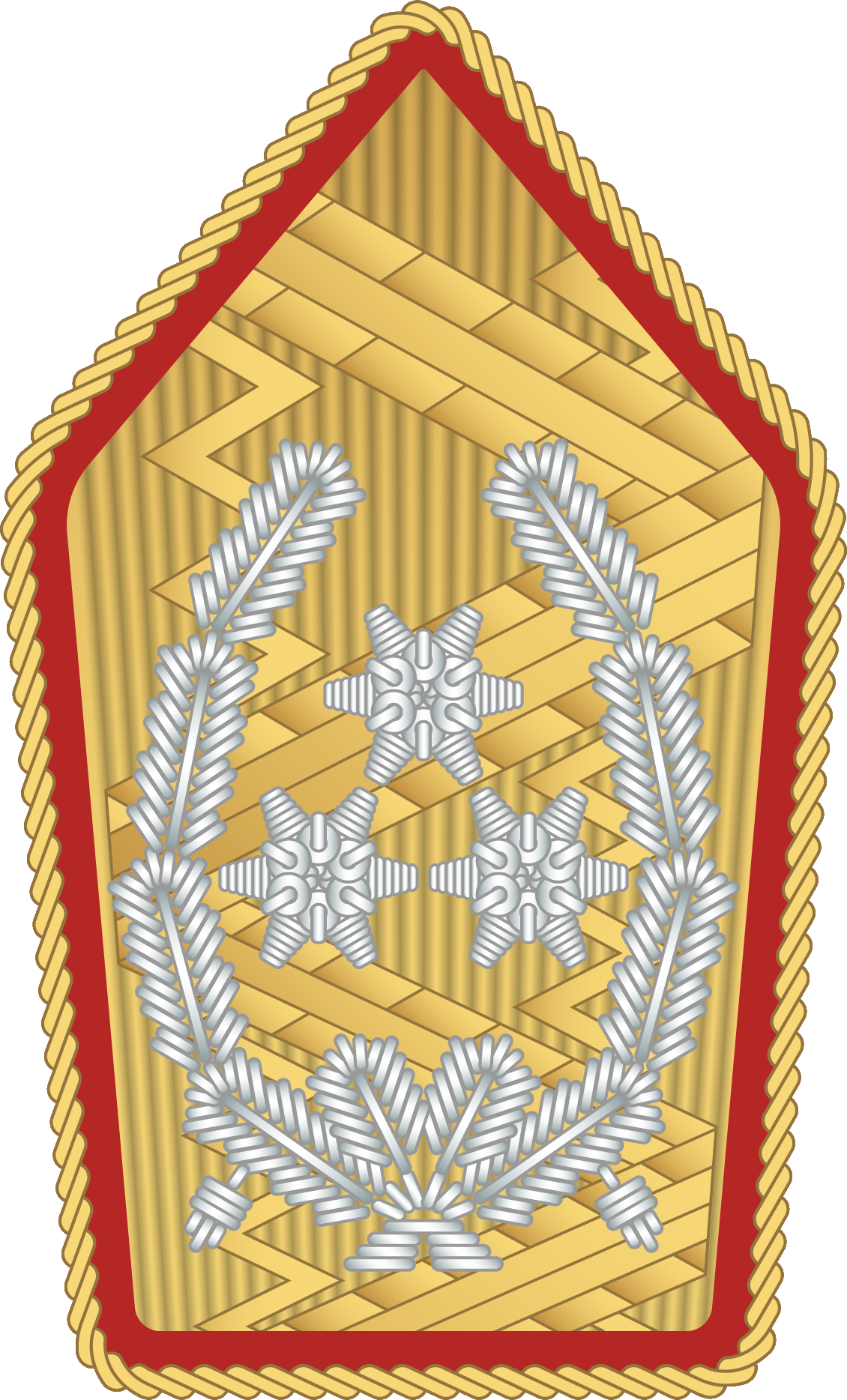
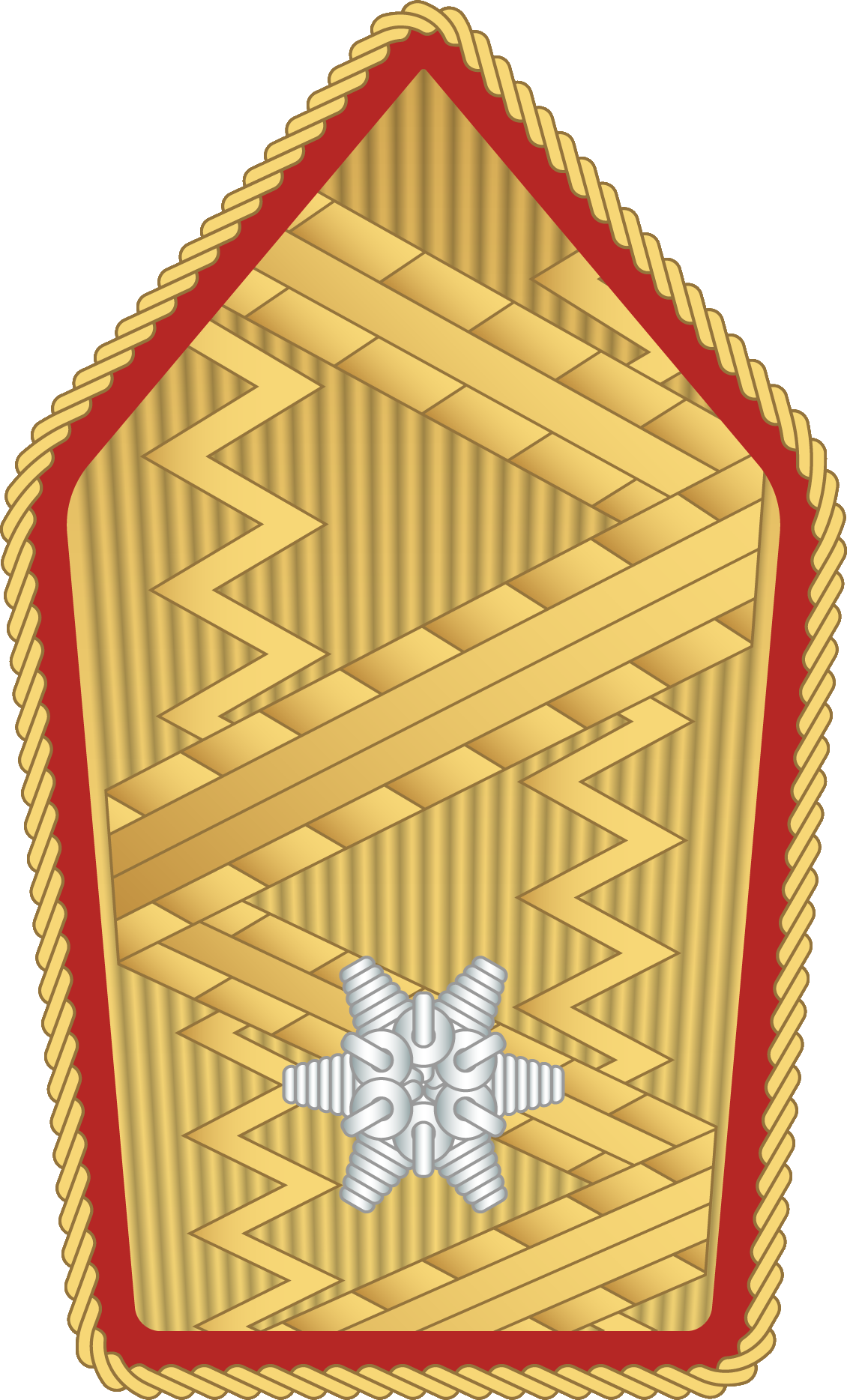
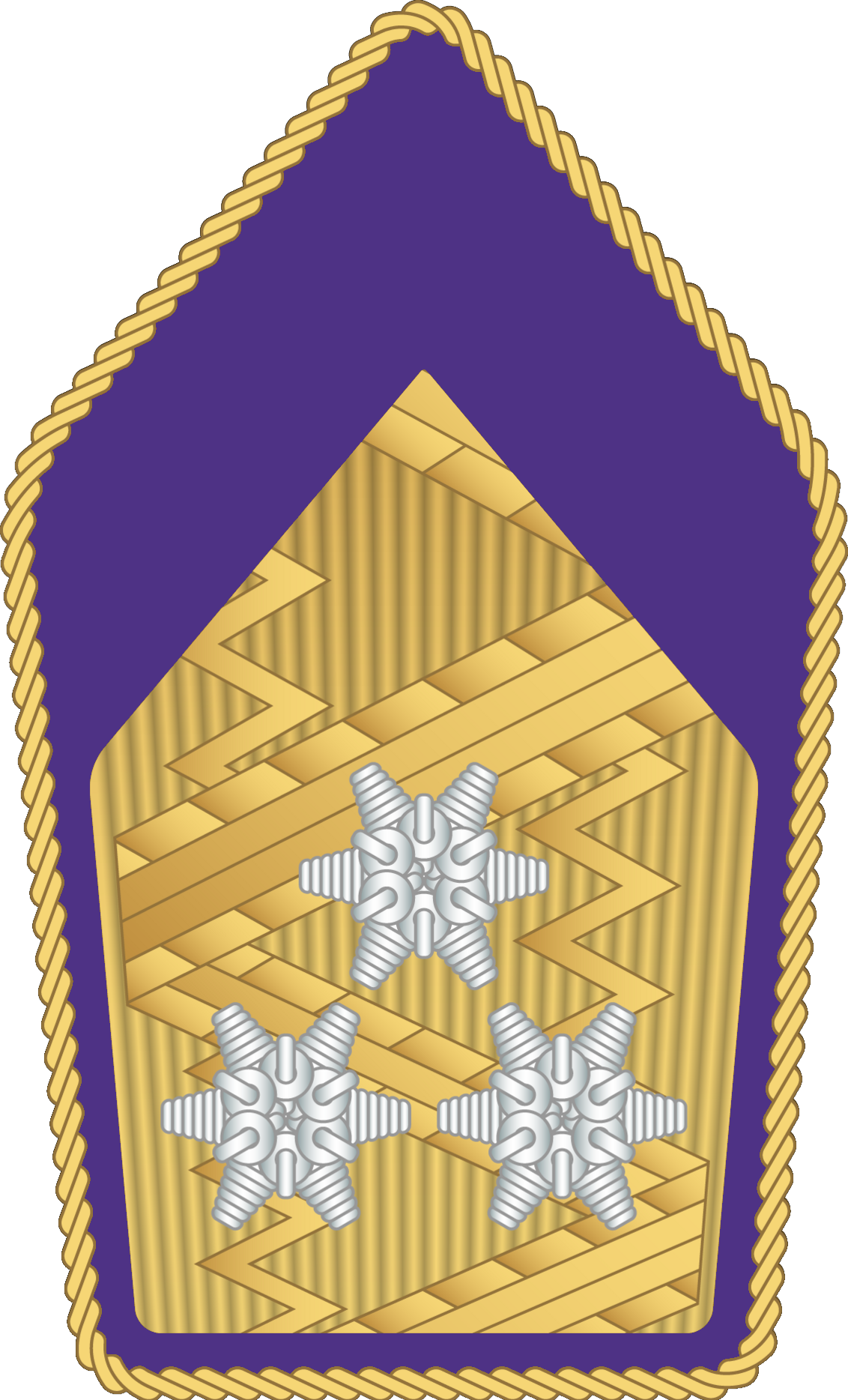
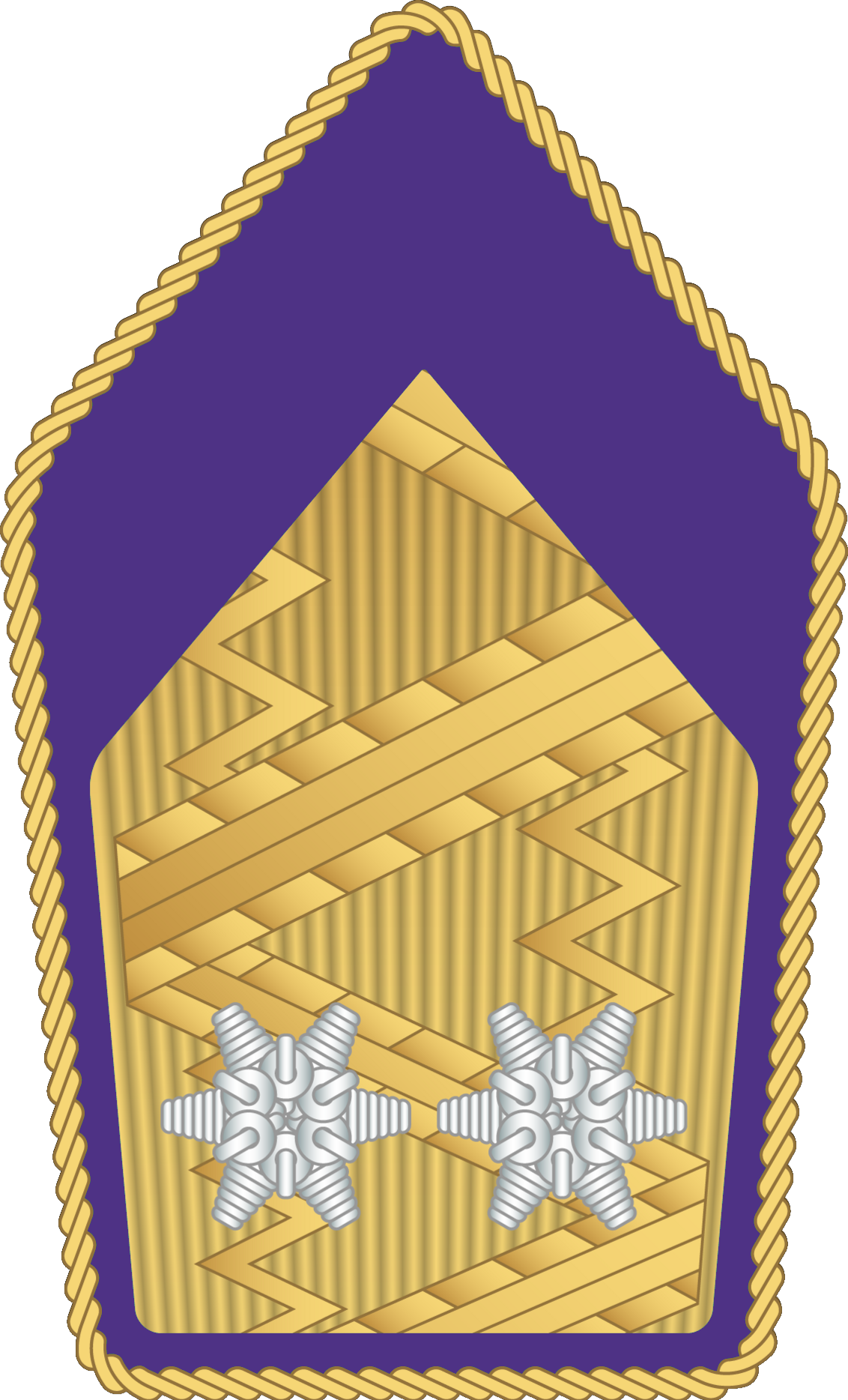
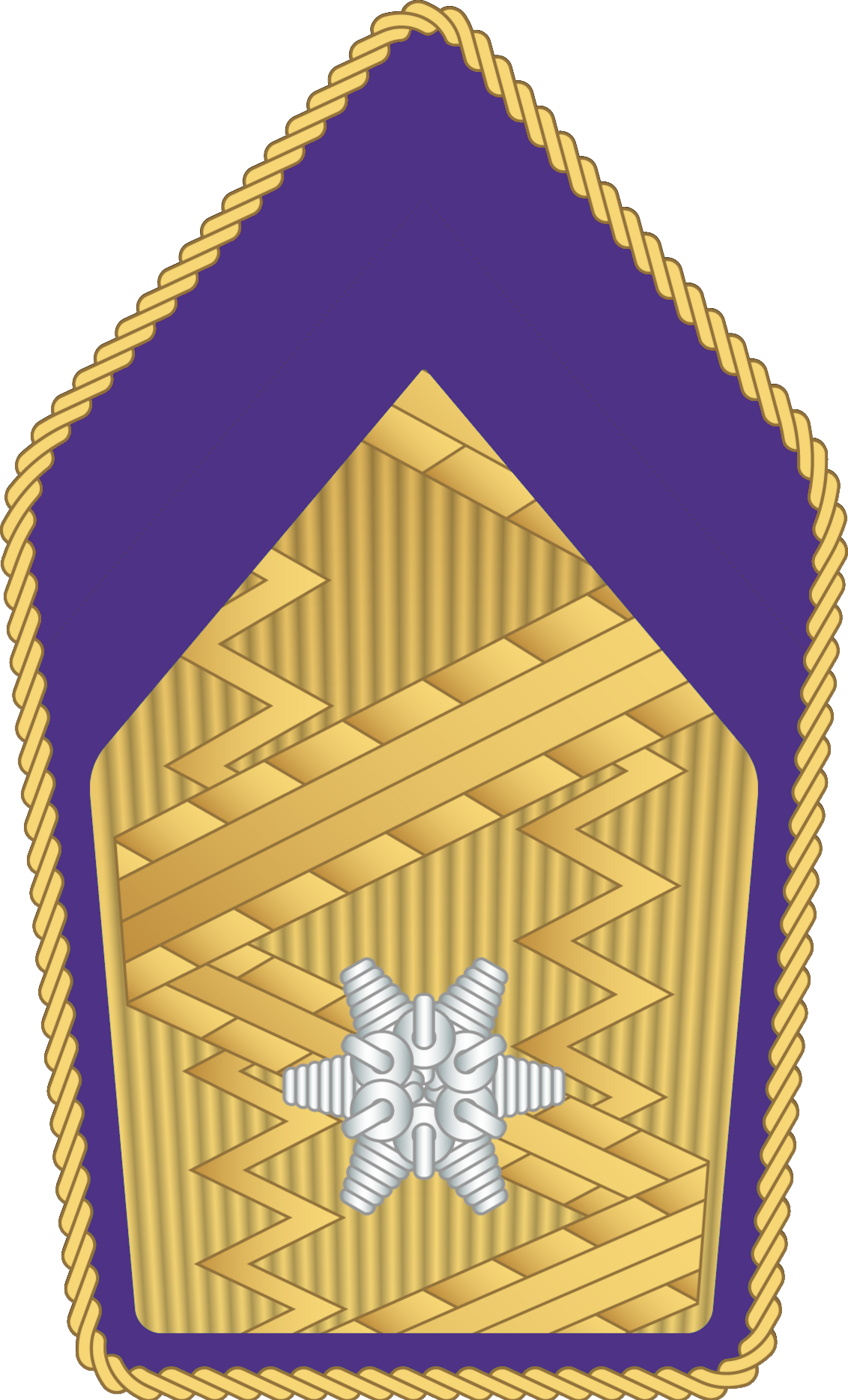
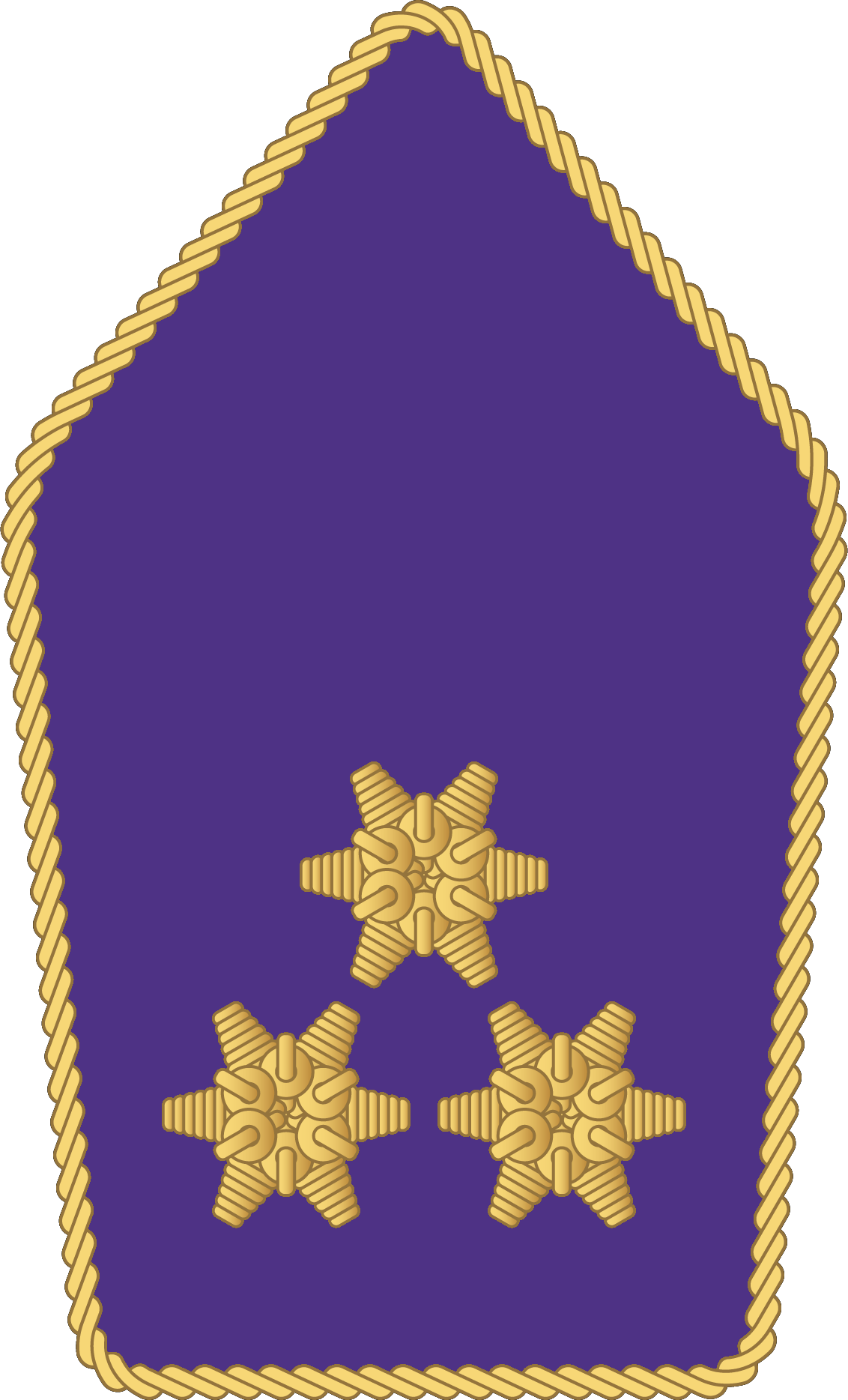
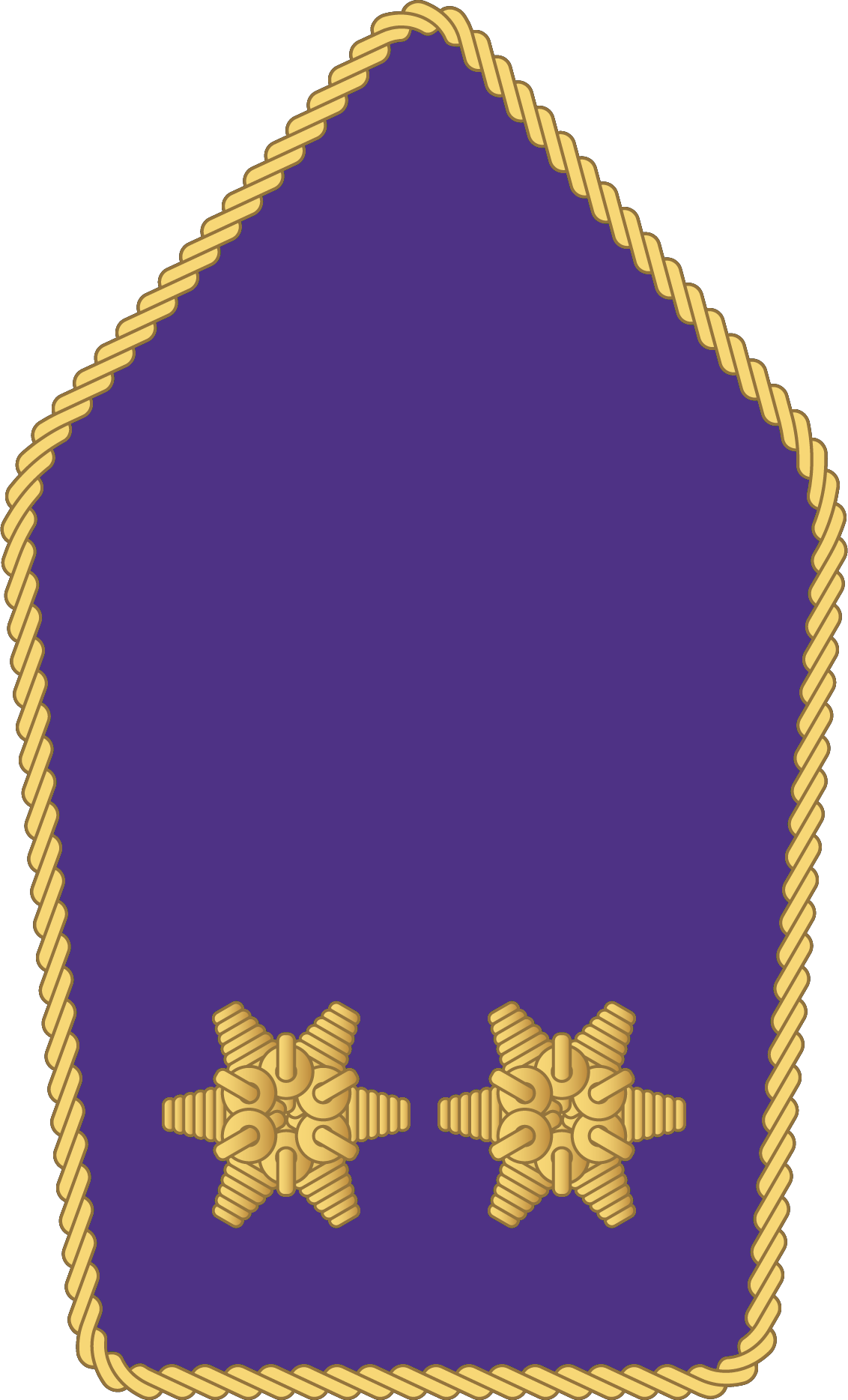
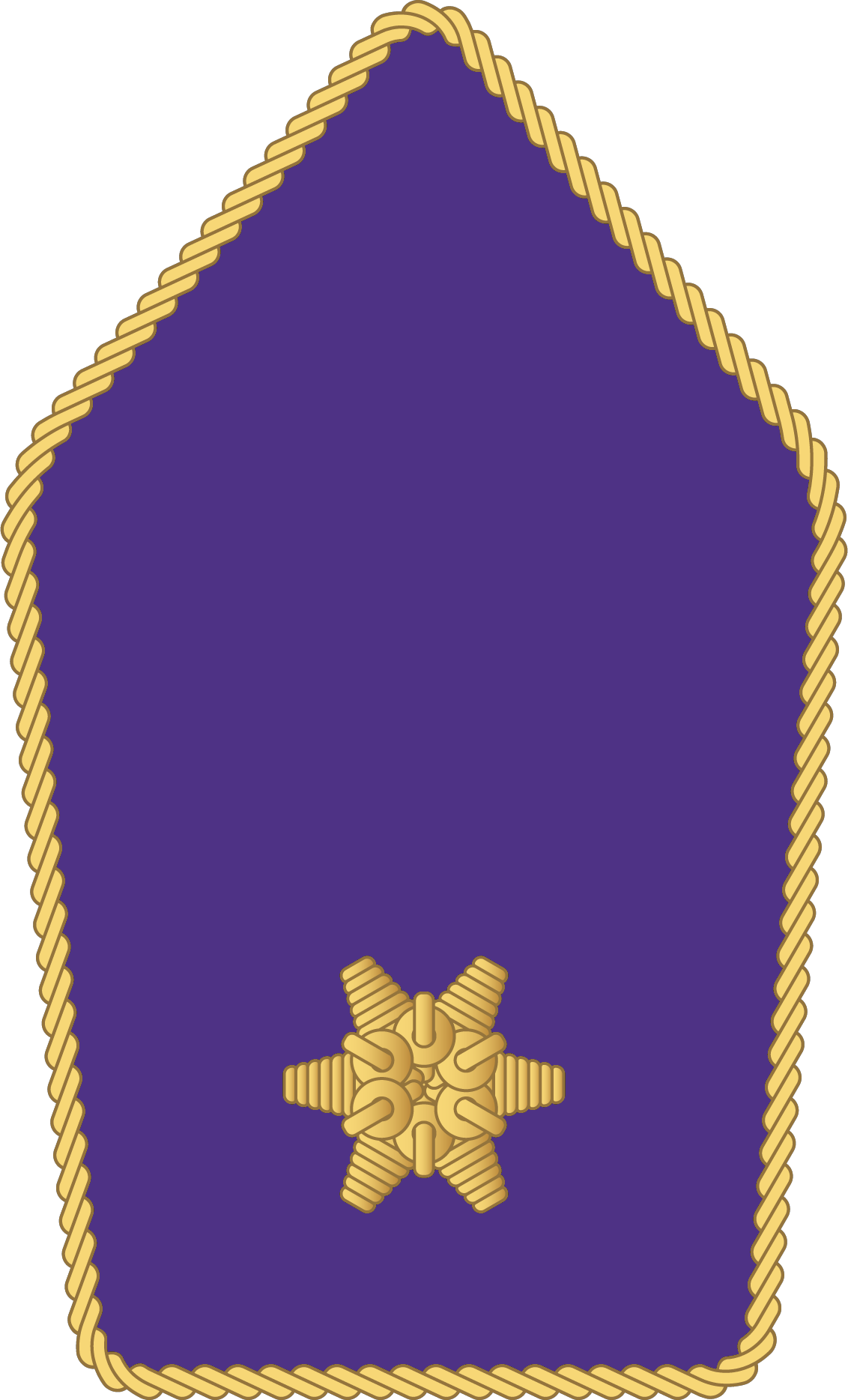
Rank group	General / flag officers				Senior officers			Junior officers
Austrian Air Force
Austrian Air Force	General	Generalleutnant	Generalmajor	Brigadier	Oberst	Oberstleutnant	Major	Hauptmann	Oberleutnant	Leutnant

=== Other ranks ===
The rank insignia of non-commissioned officers and enlisted personnel.

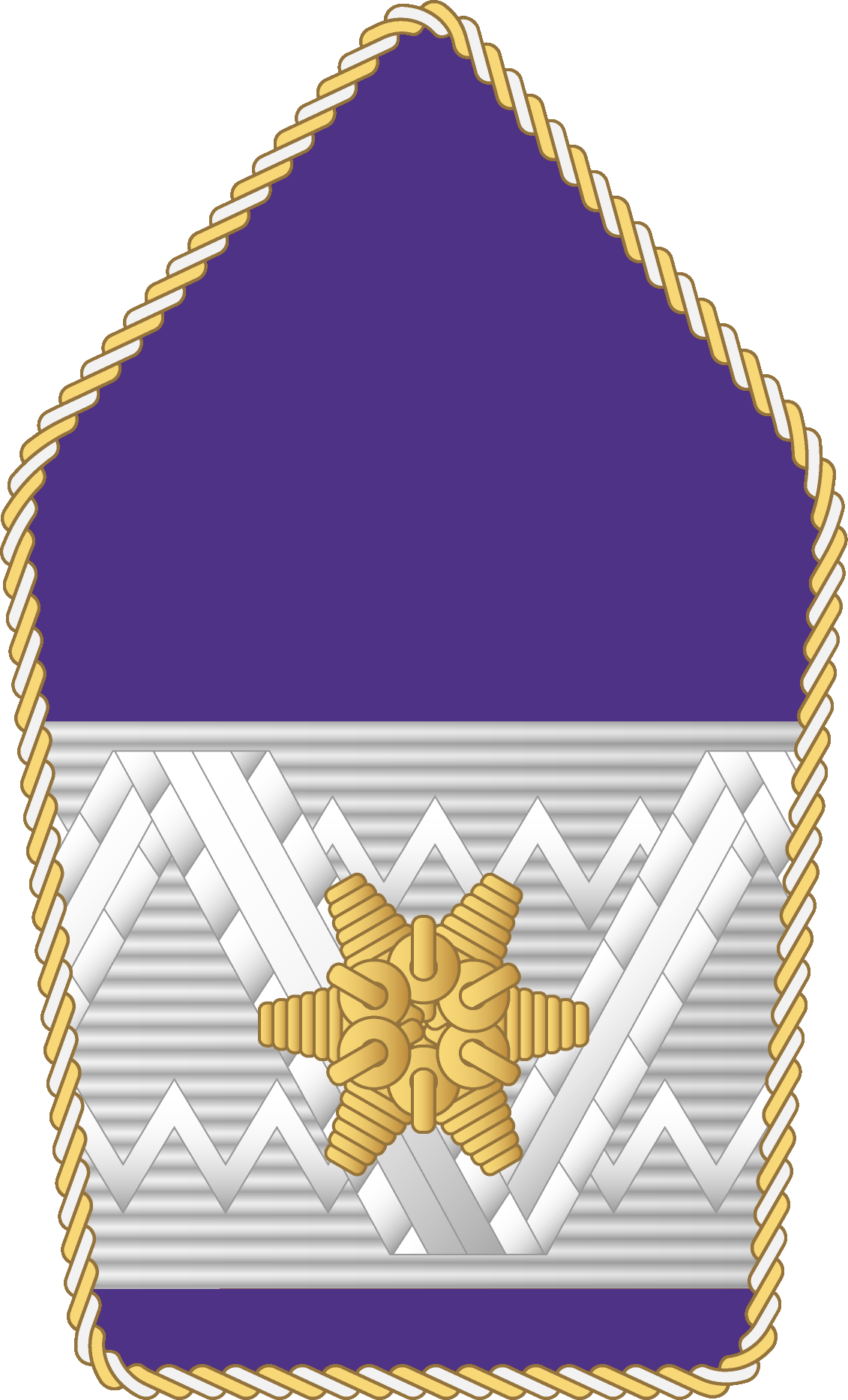
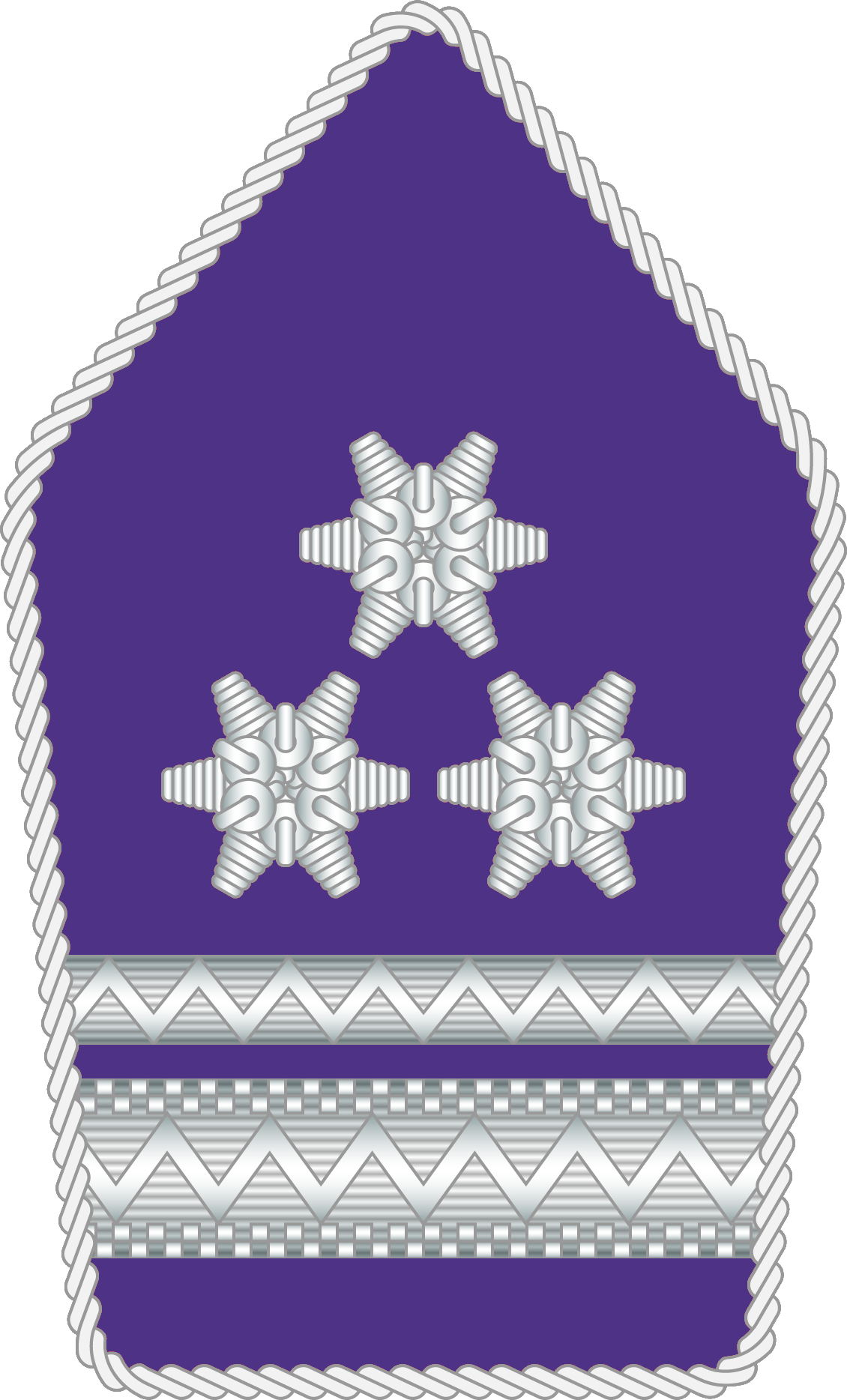
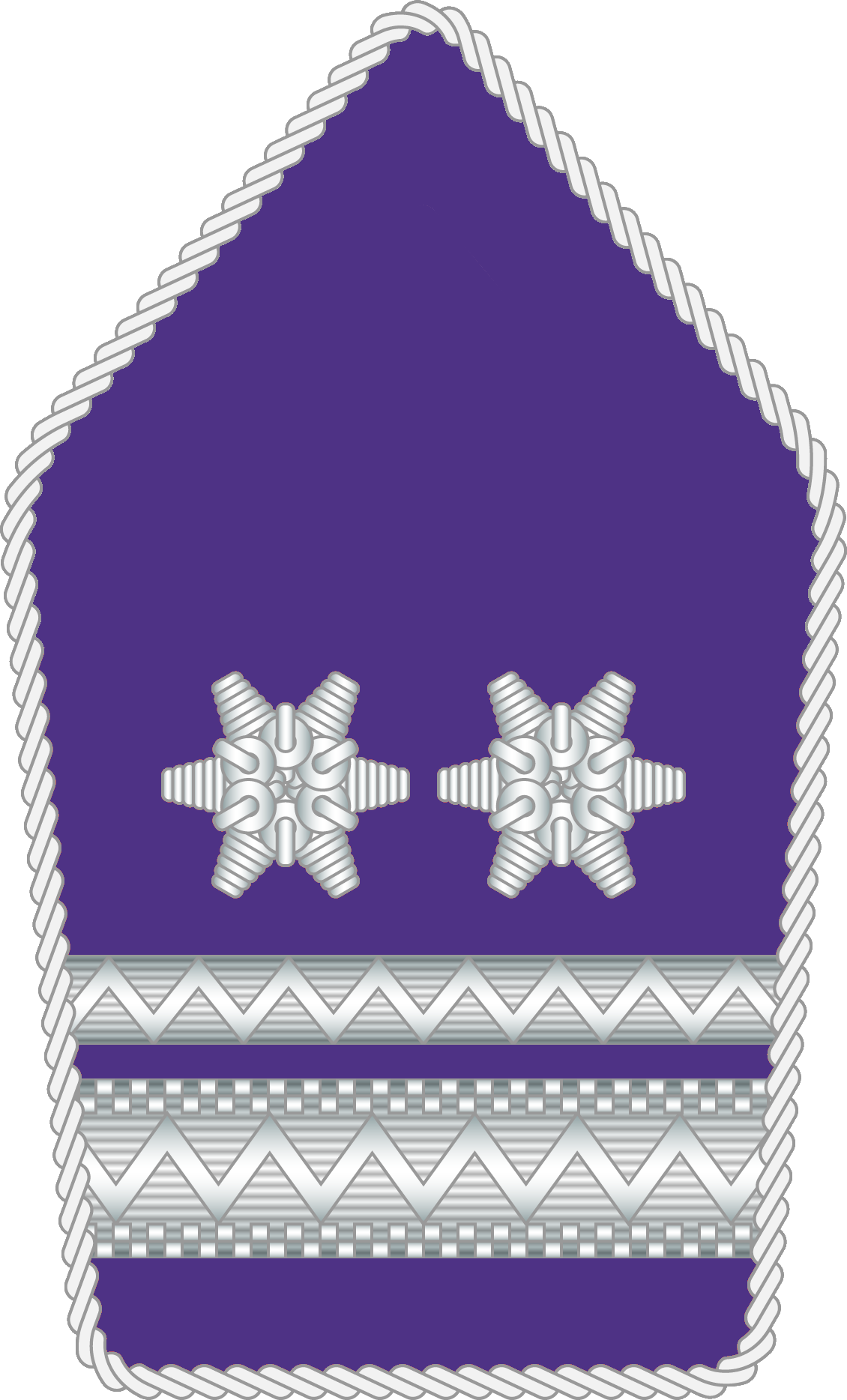
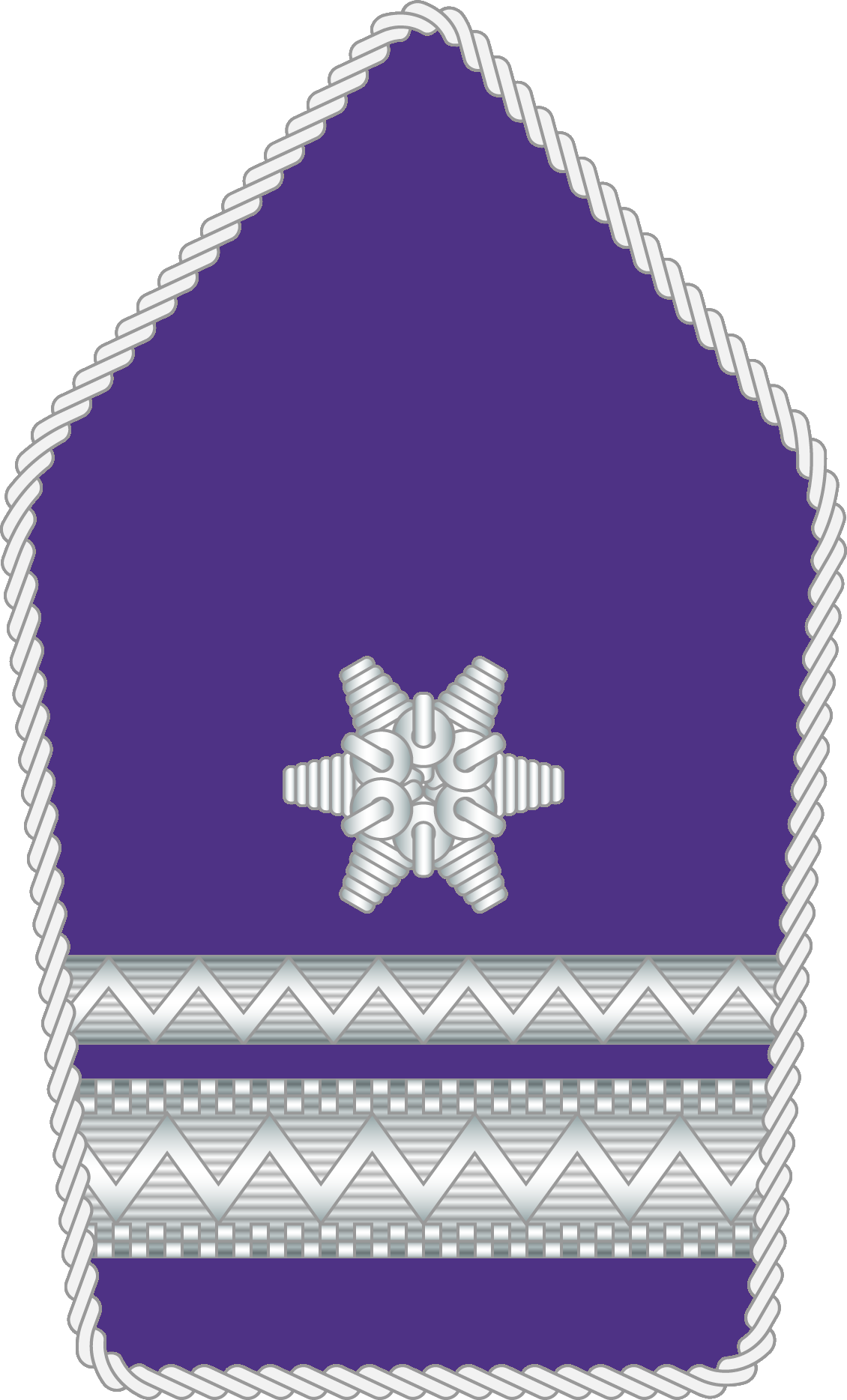
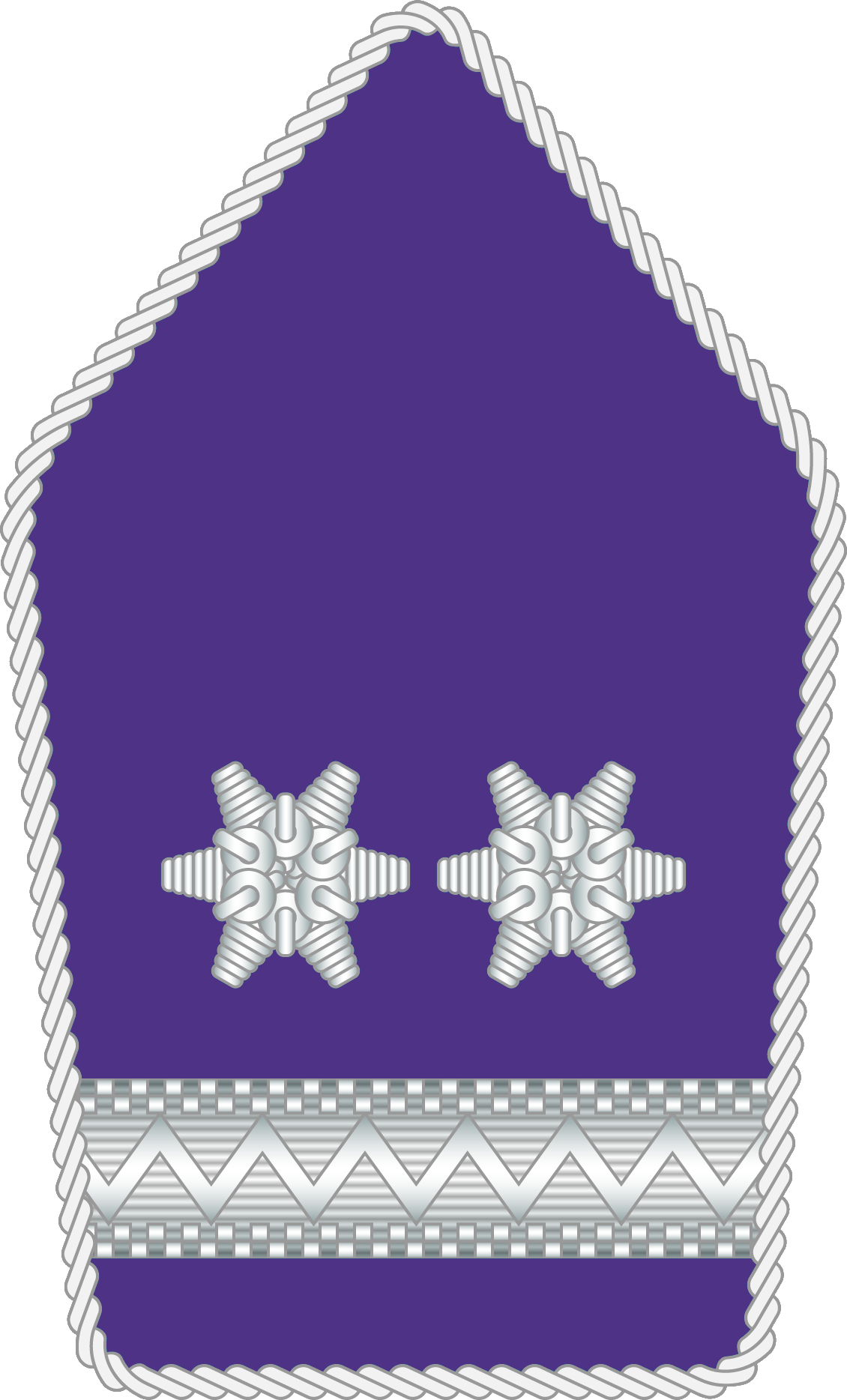
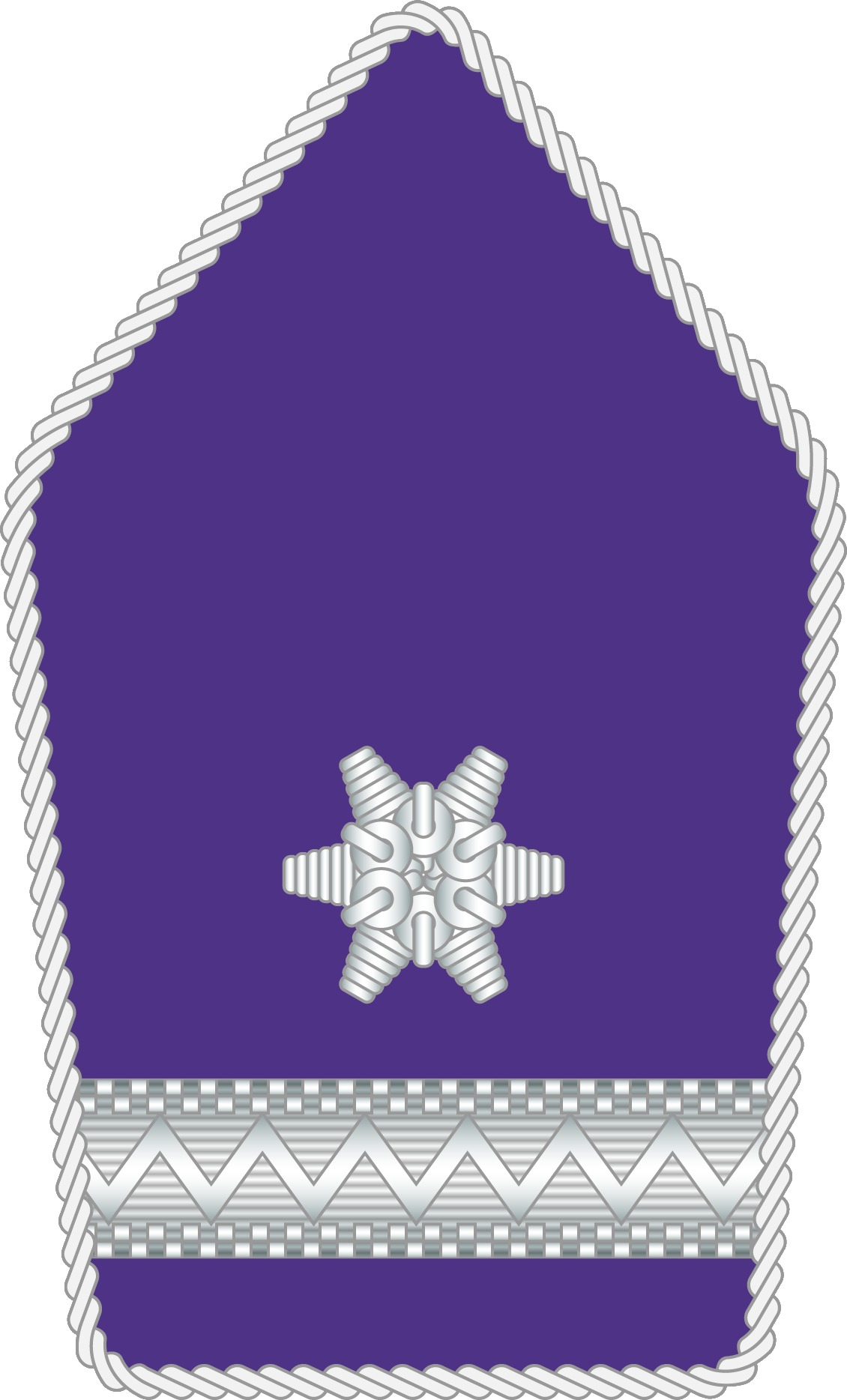
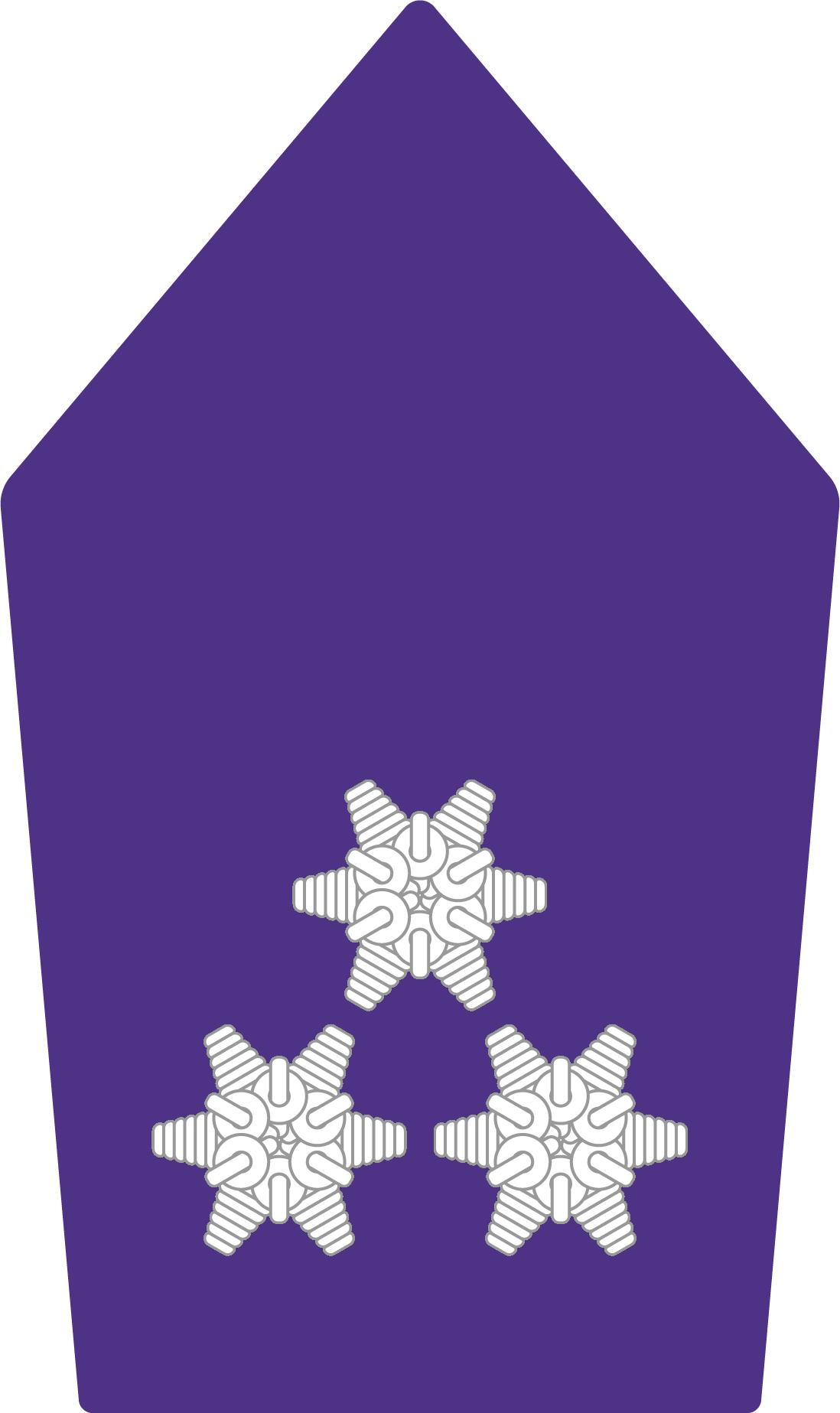
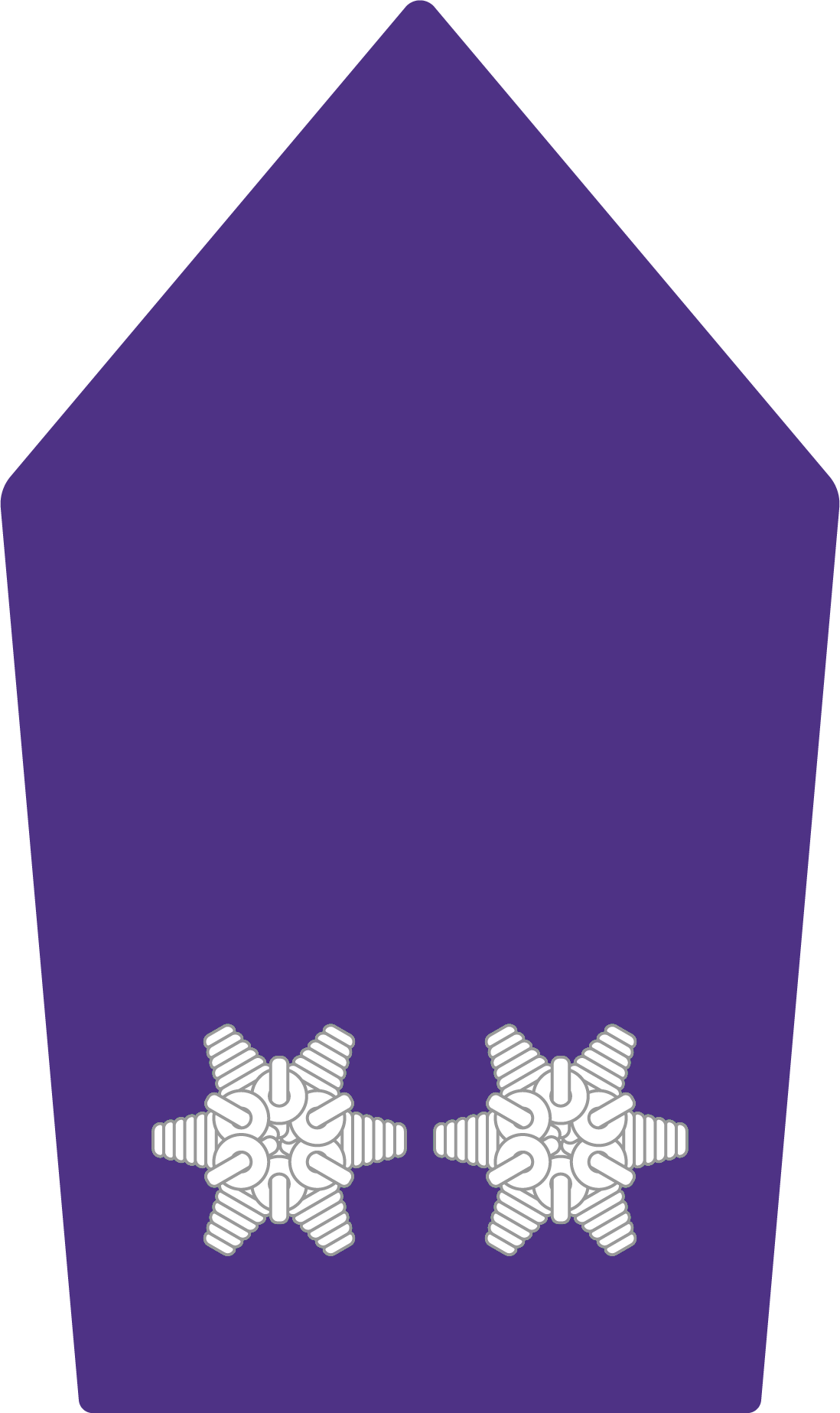
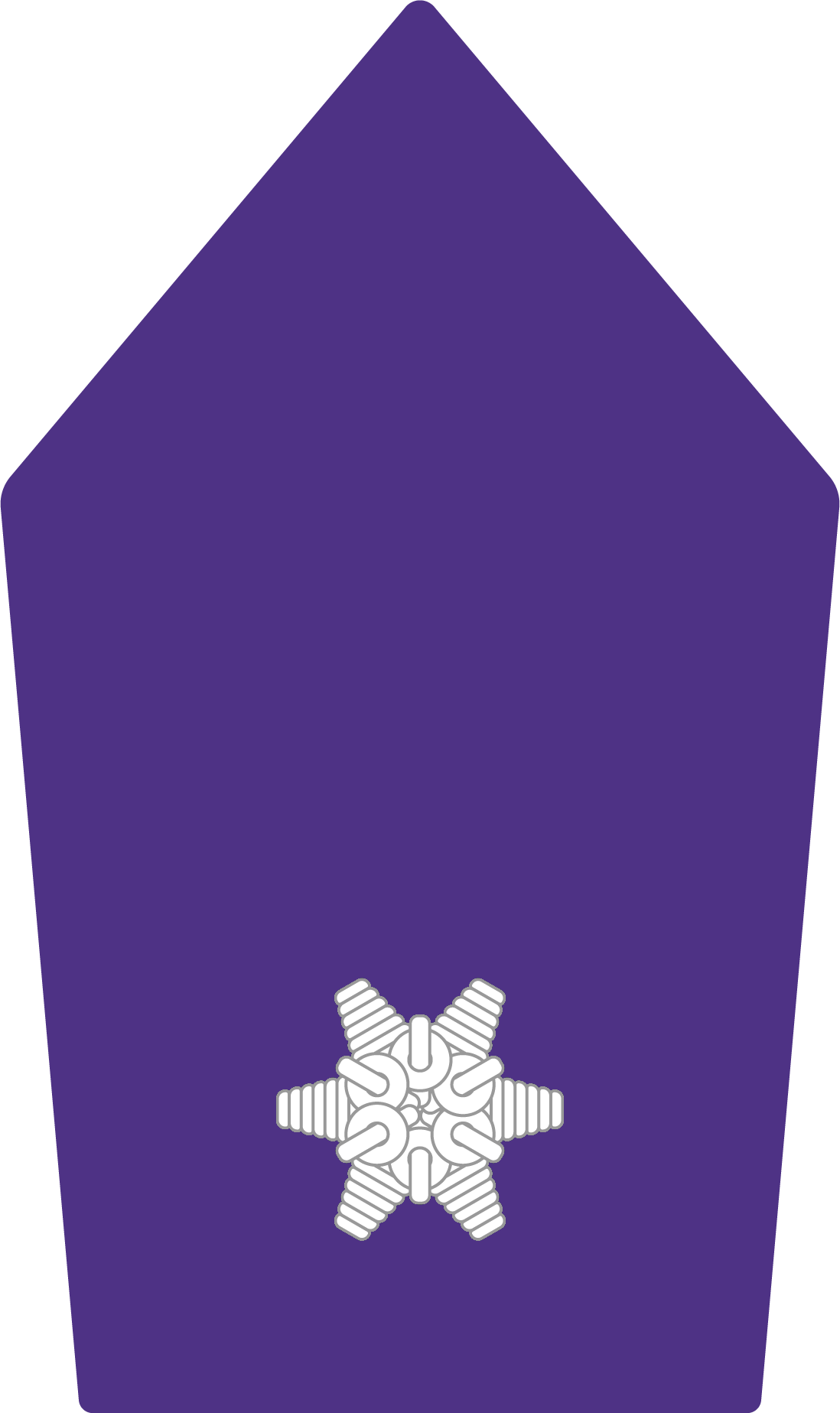
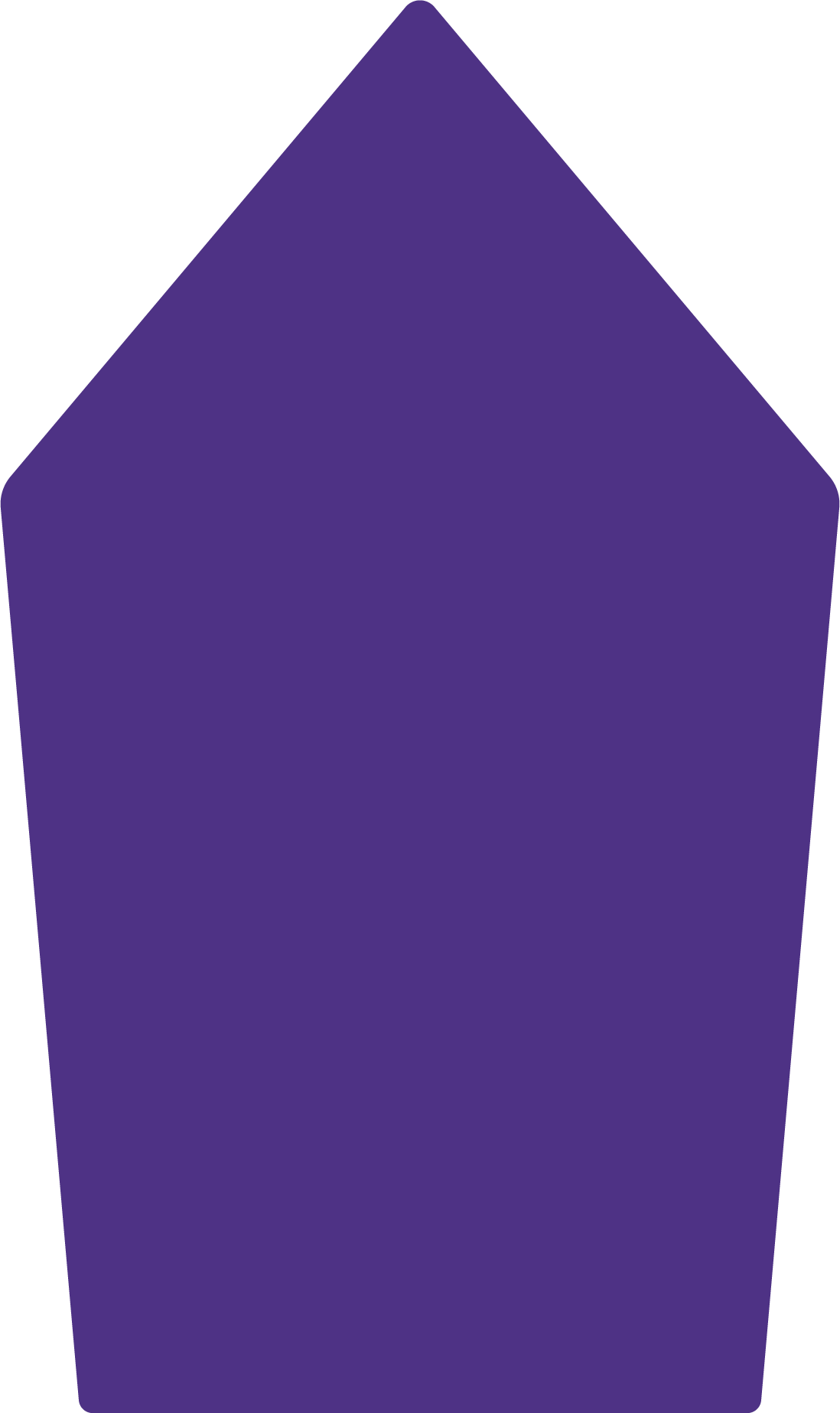
Rank group	Staff non-commissioned officer				Non-commissioned officer		Enlisted ranks			Recruit
Austrian Air Force
Austrian Air Force	Vizeleutnant	Offiziersstellvertreter	Oberstabswachtmeister	Stabswachtmeister	Oberwachtmeister	Wachtmeister	Zugsführer	Korporal	Gefreiter	Rekrut
