= USV Suppressor =

Brazilian unmanned surface vehicle

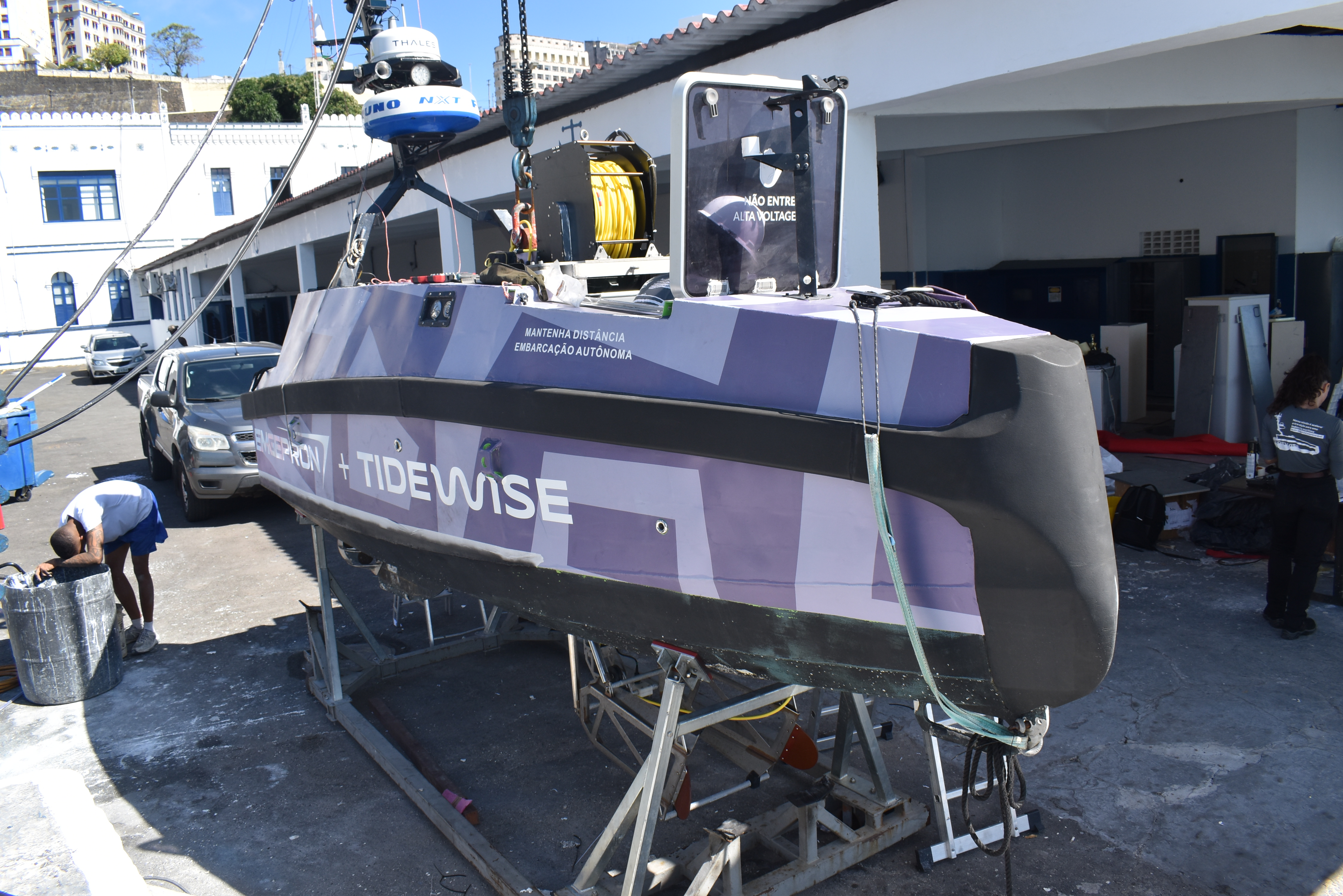
- Suppressor X prototype

Class overview
- Builders: EMGEPRON, Tidewise
- Operators: Brazilian Navy
- Building: 1

General characteristics
- Type: Unmanned surface vehicle
- Displacement: Suppressor 7: 5 t (4.9 long tons; 5.5 short tons); Suppressor 11: 8 t (7.9 long tons; 8.8 short tons)
- Length: Suppressor 7: 7 m (23 ft 0 in); Suppressor 11: 11 m (36 ft 1 in)
- Beam: Suppressor 7: 2.5 m (8 ft 2 in); Suppressor 11: 2.95 m (9 ft 8 in)
- Propulsion: Suppressor 7: 2 shaftlines with conventional propellers; Suppressor 11: 2 waterjet engines
- Speed: Suppressor 7: 24 knots (44 km/h; 28 mph); Suppressor 11: >35 knots (65 km/h; 40 mph)
- Complement: None
- Sensors & processing systems: Navigation radar, 3D LIDAR, PTZ camera and hull multibeam sonar
- Armament: Kamikaze AUV/ROV/UAV (optional)

The USV Suppressor is a type of unmanned surface vehicle under construction for the Brazilian Navy. Defined as a "Multi-purpose Unmanned Surface Vehicle" by EMGEPRON, the USV is intended for both civilian and military applications, ranging from hydrographic surveys and environmental monitoring to mine countermeasures, ISR and ASW roles.

== Characteristics ==
The USV features a navigation radar and a variety of sensors such as 360° LIDAR, FLIR cameras and a hull-mounted multibeam sonar. Additionally, Suppressor features an adaptable rear deck which can carry a ROV, AUV or UAV payload based on current mission configuration. The vessel may be either remotely operated or autonomously follow a pre-programmed route. The USV's control station is packed in a 20-foot container, allowing for operation from vessels such as Tamandaré-class frigates.

== Development ==
The project was developed in a partnership between state-owned enterprise EMGEPRON and Tidewise, a Rio de Janeiro-based startup focused on autonomous maritime systems. It was first presented in October 2023 during the MINEX-23 Brazilian Navy exercise off the coast of Salvador, where a prototype was tasked with mine countermeasures duties. On 7 February 2024, EMGEPRON and Tidewise signed a contract for the construction of the first Suppressor USV, with an estimated cost of R$20 million. The unit would be built in its basic configuration, featuring navigation sensors, multibeam sonar and a ROV, as well as the development of an Application Programming Interface for communications. Delivery of the first unit is expected towards the end of 2025.

== Gallery ==
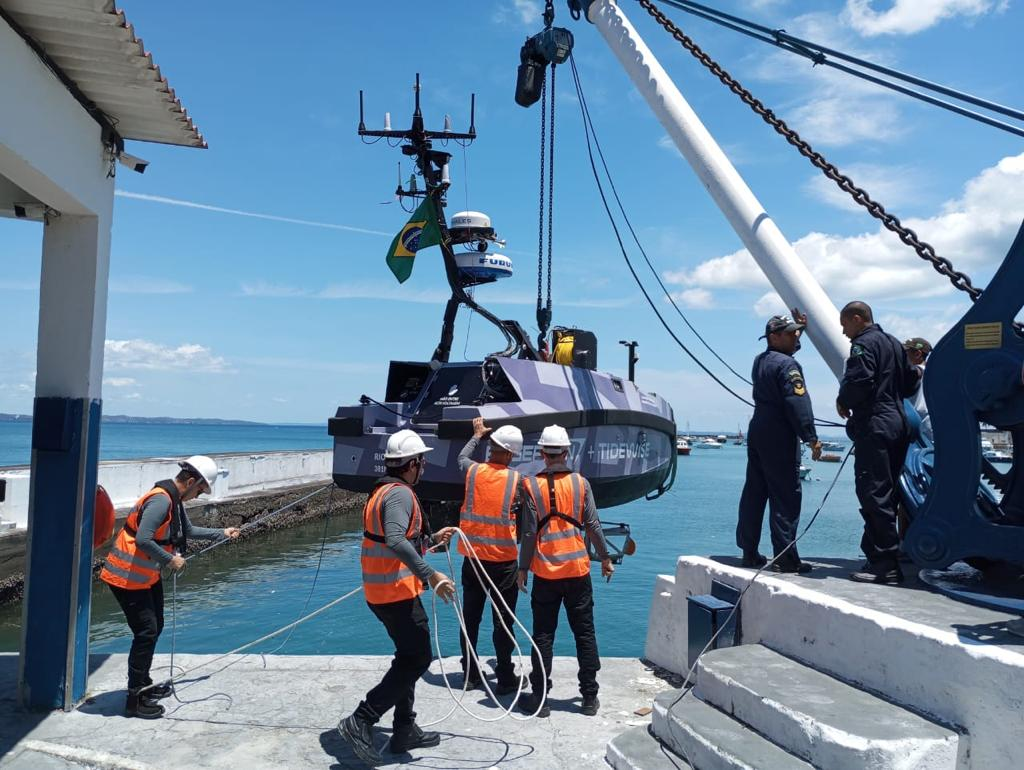
Suppressor X prototype during the MINEX-23 exercise.

== See also ==
- Fleet-class unmanned surface vessel
