= EMGEPRON =

Empresa Gerencial de Projetos Navais
- Company type: State-owned enterprise
- Industry: Shipbuilding, Naval Engineering, Naval Munitions, Nuclear propulsion
- Founded: 1982; 44 years ago
- Headquarters: Ilha das Cobras, Rio de Janeiro, Rio de Janeiro, Brazil
- Key people: vice-admiral (reserve) Francisco Antonio de Magalhães Laranjeira, (Chief Executive)
- Net income: 180 million USD (2011)
- Number of employees: about 2000
- Parent: Brazilian Navy
- Website: https://www.marinha.mil.br/emgepron/

The Empresa Gerencial de Projetos Navais (EMGEPRON), or "Naval Projects Management Company", is a Brazilian state-owned company linked to the Ministry of Defence of Brazil through the Command of the Navy. In addition to project management, the company commercializes Brazilian naval defense products and services.

The Empresa Gerencial de Projetos Navais employs about 2,000 people. it was established in 1982 and its facilities are on Ilha das Cobras, Rio de Janeiro.

== Mission ==
EMGEPRON operates across the full spectrum of technology projects developed by the Brazilian Navy. Their mission is research, construction and modernization of military ships. They also manufacture artillery ammunition, and provide oceanographic services, logistics support and scientific training.

== Projects and products ==
EMGEPRON manages naval-related projects, produces and updates a wide variety of major vessels, as well as some light river patrol vessels.

- MODFRAG - Modernization of Brazilian Navy Niteroi class frigates.
- Barroso Class.
- Macaé class patrol vessels.
- Grajaú class - Brazilian patrol boat.
- Tupi class -Type 209 submarine.
- Tikuna class-Brazilian submarine based on the Type 209 submarine.
- FAJCMC - Production of artillery ammunition, for domestic use and export.
- Nuclear technology - Support to the São Paulo Naval Technology Centre (CTMSP) studies in nuclear fuel and propulsion.
- LEPLAC - Determination of the continental shelf, on behalf of the Governments of Brazil and Namibia, in order to support EEZ claims.
- Roraima class river patrol vessel
- Marlim patrol vessel
- LAR (Lancha de ação rápida)- Fast Action Craft.
- USV Suppressor

=== PRONAVAL ===
The aim of Angola's Naval Power Development Program (PRONAVAL) is to provide the Angolan navy with seven Macaé class patrol vessels. EMGEPRON has been selected to run the program as well as oversee the building of a shipyard in Angola and training the associated industrial and naval personnel. Four vessels will be built in Brazil, and three in Angola.

=== FAJCMC ===
The Admiral Jurandyr da Costa Müller de Campos ammunition factory (FAJCMC) is owned by the Brazilian Navy and since 1996 has been managed by EMGEPRON. In addition to managing the production of ammunition for the Brazilian Navy, EMGEPRON is responsible for marketing abroad. Products have mainly been exported to South America, Africa and Asia.

=== Nuclear Technology ===
EMGEPRON has provided specialists to the Navy Technology Center in São Paulo (CTMSP) in support of two of the Brazilian Navy's nuclear power generation projects: The Fuel Cycle Project and The Electric-Core Generation Laboratory Project (LABGENE).
