= Macaé-class patrol vessel =

Brazilian military vessel

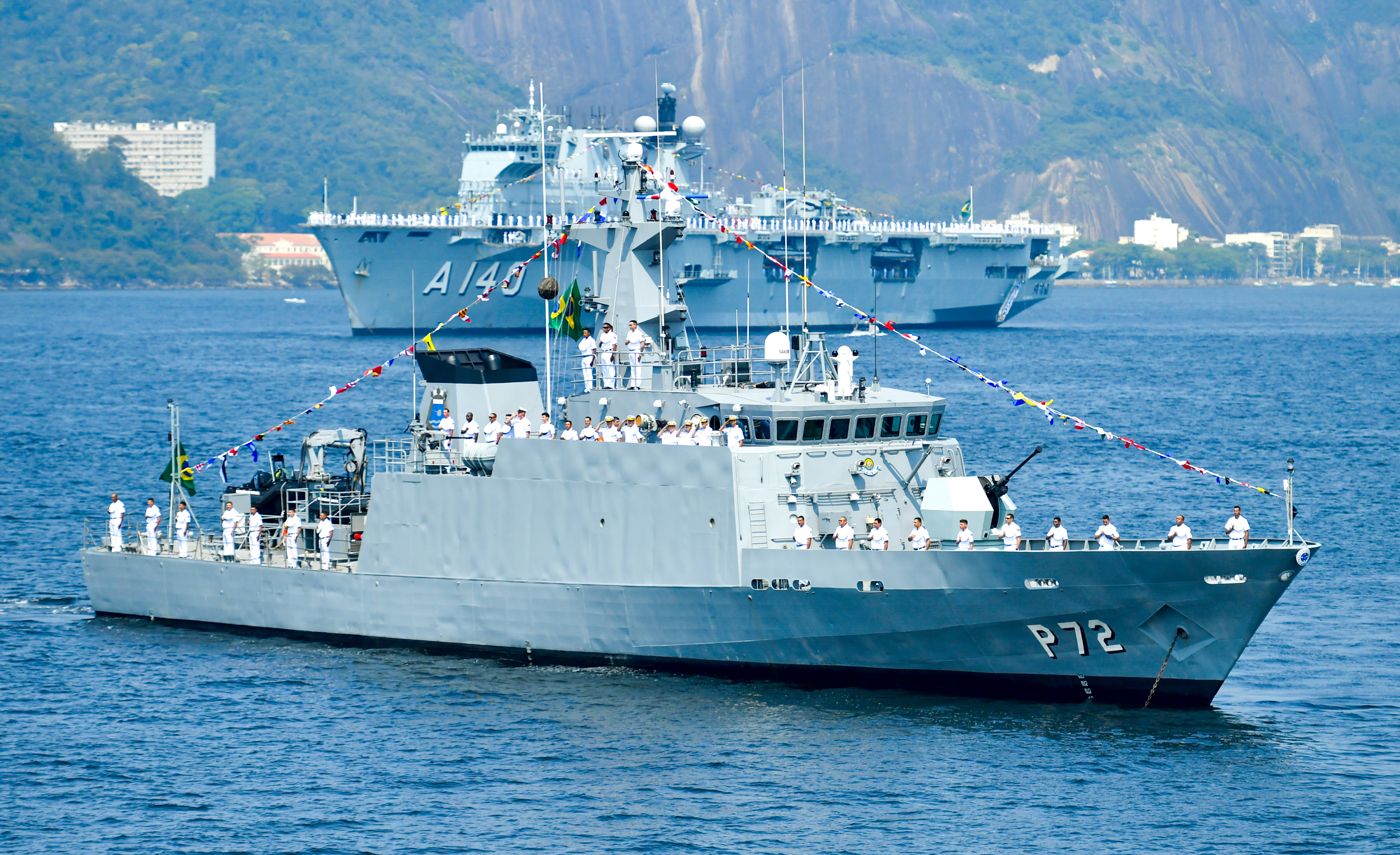
- Maracanã

Class overview
- Name: Macaé class
- Builders: AMRJ, INACE, EISA
- Operators: Brazilian Navy
- Preceded by: Grajaú class
- Succeeded by: Navio Patrulha de 500 Toneladas
- In commission: 2009–present
- Building: 1
- Completed: 4
- Active: 4

General characteristics
- Type: Offshore patrol vessel
- Displacement: 500 tons
- Length: 55.6 m (182 ft 5 in)
- Beam: 9.3 m (30 ft 6 in)
- Draught: 2.5 m (8 ft 2 in)
- Propulsion: 2 × MTU 16V 4000 M90
- Speed: 21 knots (39 km/h; 24 mph)
- Range: 2,500 nmi (4,600 km; 2,900 mi) at 15 knots (28 km/h; 17 mph)
- Boats & landing craft carried: 1 × RHIBs
- Complement: 35
- Sensors & processing systems: Sperry Marine VisionMaster FT Integrated Bridge Navigation System; FT250 X band and S band radars
- Armament: 1 × Bofors L/70 40 mm (fitted on Macaé and Macau); 1 × Bofors Mk4 40 mm (fitted on Maracanã, Mangaratiba and Miramar); 2 × Oerlikon GAM-BO1 20 mm
- Notes: Sources:

The Macaé class are a series of offshore patrol vessels being built for the Brazilian Navy by Arsenal de Marinha do Rio de Janeiro.

== History ==
The class was based on the CMN Vigilante 400 CL54 design. The first two Macaé-class ships were built by INACE, following a 2006 contract. It was delivered in 2012, while the second ship was delivered in 2010.

The construction of Maracanã and Mangaratiba was begun by Estaleiro Ilha (EISA), but following the shipyard's bankruptcy in 2015, it was halted and the hulls had to be transported to AMRJ, and restarted in the early 2020s. The laid down of Miramar took place in November 2024.

== Ships of the class ==
No.	Name	Builder	Laid down	Comm.
P70	Macaé	INACE	24 Nov 2006	13 Dec 2009
P71	Macau	INACE	17 Jul 2007	30 Nov 2010
P72	Maracanã	EISA/AMRJ	25 Nov 2009	7 Sep 2022
P73	Mangaratiba	EISA/AMRJ	19 Dec 2013	30 Oct 2026
P74	Miramar	AMRJ	28 Nov 2024	2028
