= Brazilian patrol boat Macaé =

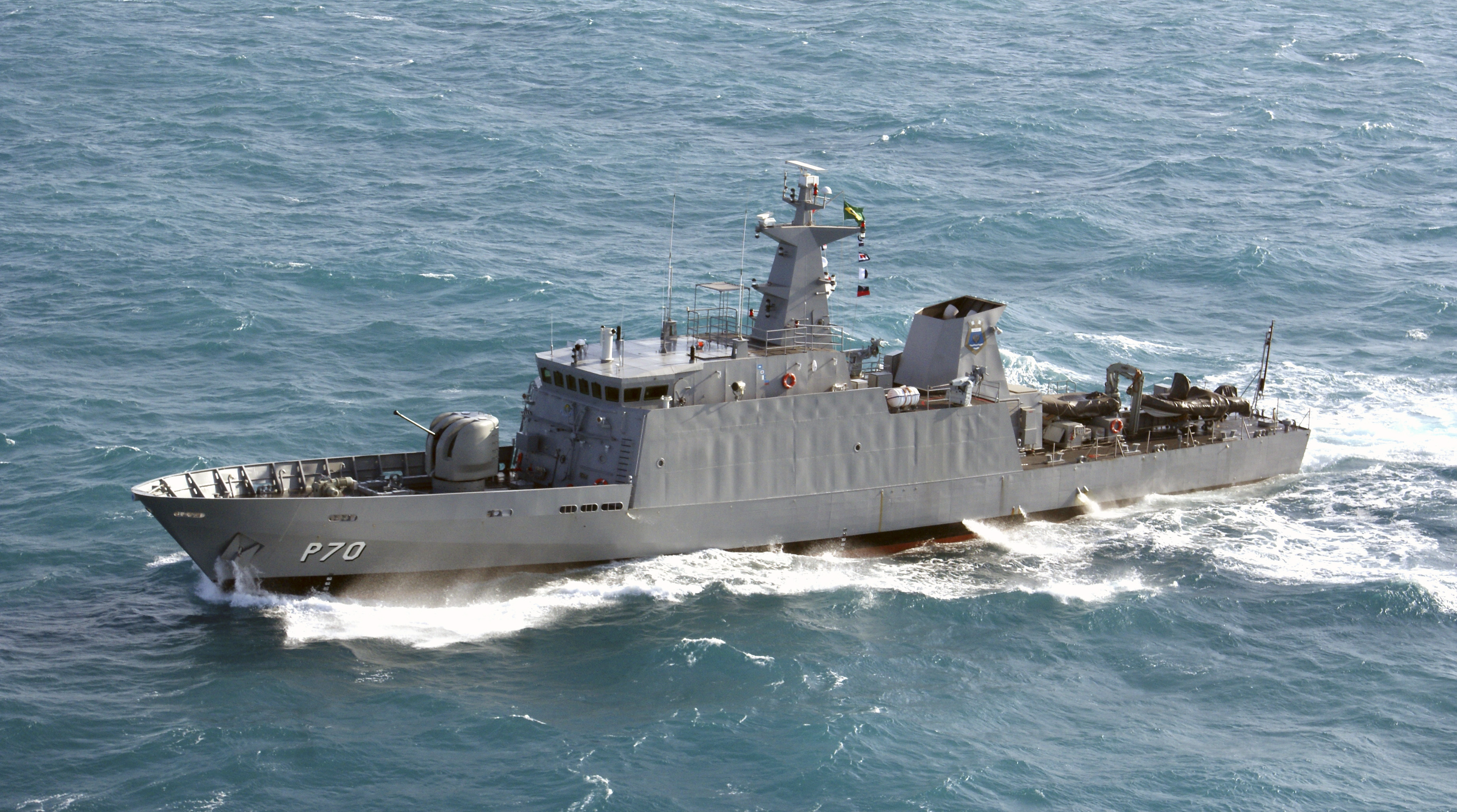

History

Brazil
- Name: Macaé
- Namesake: Macaé
- Identification: MMSI number: 710485000; Callsign: PWAE
- Status: Active

General characteristics
- Class & type: Macaé-class patrol vessel
- Tonnage: 477 tons
- Displacement: 500 tons
- Length: 55.6 m (182 ft 5 in)
- Beam: 9.3 m (30 ft 6 in)
- Draught: 2.5 m (8 ft 2 in)
- Propulsion: 2 × MTU 16V 4000 M90
- Speed: 21 knots (39 km/h; 24 mph)
- Range: 2,500 nmi (4,600 km; 2,900 mi) at 15 knots (28 km/h; 17 mph)
- Complement: 35
- Sensors & processing systems: Sperry Marine VisionMaster FT Integrated Bridge Navigation System; with FT250 X band and S band radars
- Electronic warfare & decoys: 1 × 40 mm ST 40mm L70 NADM330 gun; 2 × GAM B01 20 mm

The Brazilian patrol boat Macaé is the lead ship of Macaé-class patrol vessels of the Brazilian Navy.

== Design and description ==
The ship is equipped with a 40 mm cannon, two 20 mm guns, two propulsion engines, three power generators and communications equipment that allow to be in continuous contact with other ships and Navy organizations. It develops a maximum speed of 21 knots (39 km/h; 24 mph), has the ability to stay 10 days at sea with a radius of more than 4,500 kilometres (2,800 mi).

Built by the shipbuilding industry of Ceará SA (INAC), the vessel's name is a tribute to the coastal city of Rio de Janeiro, an important center of support for offshore oil exploration in Brazil. The keel of Macaé was laid down on November 24, 2006, the first of a new class of patrol boats. The Macaé class is based on the design of the French Vigilante 400 CL54 patrol ship, which was amended and improved to incorporate technological developments and improvements in the performance of the ship.

With a battery life of 10 days and mileage over 4,500 km Macaé assists in the supervision of the Brazilian legal waters (AJB), developing the activities of patrol ships, naval inspection, safety of life at sea, pollution control sea and protection of oil fields in the sea, besides contributing to the national security of maritime traffic.

Seeking to nationalize the implementation of the construction project the patrol vessel Macaé, the Navy has achieved an overall 60%. Among the modern nationalized systems, whose high degree of complexity add cutting-edge technology to the industrial sector involved, included the System Monitoring and Control of Machines (SCM) and the Intelligent Tactical Terminal (TTI).
