= Oerlikon GAI-BO1 =

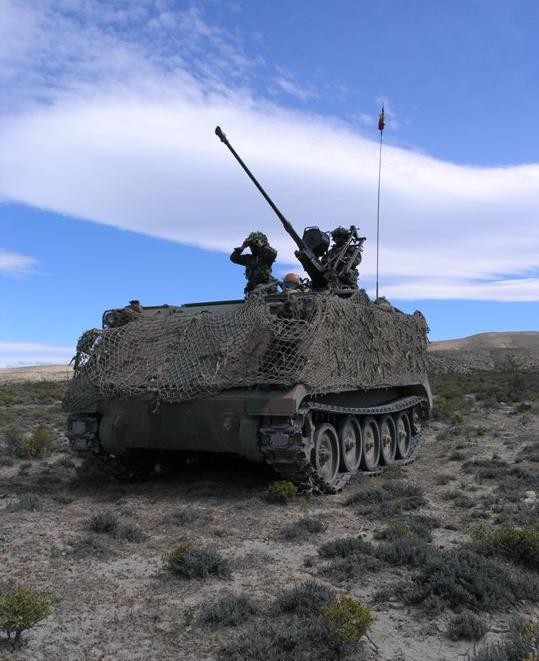
- Oerlikon GAI-BO1 mounted on a M113
- Type: Anti-aircraft gun Autocannon
- Place of origin: Switzerland

Service history
- Used by: Argentina; Austria; Nigeria; South Africa; Spain; Switzerland; Afghanistan
- Wars: Cold War

Production history
- Designer: Oerlikon
- Designed: 1950s
- Manufacturer: Oerlikon

Specifications
- Mass: 405 kg (893 lb)
- Length: 3.8 m (12 ft 6 in)
- Barrel length: 2.4 m (7 ft 10 in)
- Width: 1.5 m (4 ft 11 in)
- Height: 2.5 m (8 ft 2 in)
- Crew: 2
- Shell: Fixed QF 20×128 mm
- Shell weight: .125 kg (4.4 oz)
- Caliber: 20 mm (0.79 in)
- Action: Gas
- Carriage: Two wheeled carriage with three folding outriggers
- Elevation: -5° to +85°
- Traverse: 360°
- Rate of fire: 1,000 rpm (cyclic)
- Muzzle velocity: 1,100 m/s (3,600 ft/s)
- Effective firing range: AA: 2 km (6,600 ft); Ground: 1.5 km (0.93 mi)
- Maximum firing range: AA: 4.5 km (15,000 ft); Ground: 5.7 km (3.5 mi)
- Feed system: 8-round magazine 20-round magazine 50-round magazine
- Sights: 1× aerial targets 3.5× ground targets

The Oerlikon GAI-BO1 is a Swiss designed and built light anti-aircraft gun which is mounted on a two-wheeled carriage with three folding outriggers. Due to its light weight and ability to be broken down into small loads it can also be mounted on ships and vehicles.

== Description ==
The GAI-BO1 consists of a KAB 20×128 mm auto-cannon mounted on a folding platform. The gun has no power assistance with elevation of the counter-balanced barrel controlled by a hand-wheel and traverse is by foot. Due to its lack of power assistance it is unable to engage fast moving aerial targets, although it is still useful for engaging light observation aircraft and helicopters. Three different sized magazines (8-round, 20-round and 50-rounds) are available. There is a simple mechanical computing sight with 1× magnification for aerial targets and a 3.5× scope for engaging ground targets. In its ground role it can fire armor-piercing rounds capable of piercing 15 mm (0.59 in) of rolled homogeneous armor at 600 m (2,000 ft).
