= Alacrity =

Alacrity may refer to:

- Alacrity (ship), various ships, including:
  - Alacrity (1813 ship), a British merchant ship
  - SS Alacrity (1893), a French tugboat used by the Royal Australian Navy during World War I
- HMS Alacrity, various Royal Navy ships
- USS Alacrity, several US Navy ships
- Operation Alacrity, a proposed World War II Allied occupation of the Azores in 1943

== See also ==
- Alacrity 19, a British trailerable sailboat designed by Peter Stevenson
- Diligence
- Enthusiasm
- Speed
