= Alacrity (ship) =

Several ships have been named Alacrity:

- Alacrity (1814 ship) was launched at Newcastle-on-Tyne. New owners transferred her registry to London and she then spent much of her career sailing between Britain and the Cape of Good Hope (CGH, or the Cape), sometimes going on to India. She made at least one voyage to New South Wales. New owners in 1829 returned her registry to Newcastle. She was wrecked in 1830.
- SS Alacrity (1893)

== See also ==
- HMS Alacrity – one of nine ships of the Royal Navy
- USS Alacrity – one of three ships of the US Navy
