= Brazilian corvette Júlio de Noronha =

Inhaúma-class corvettes

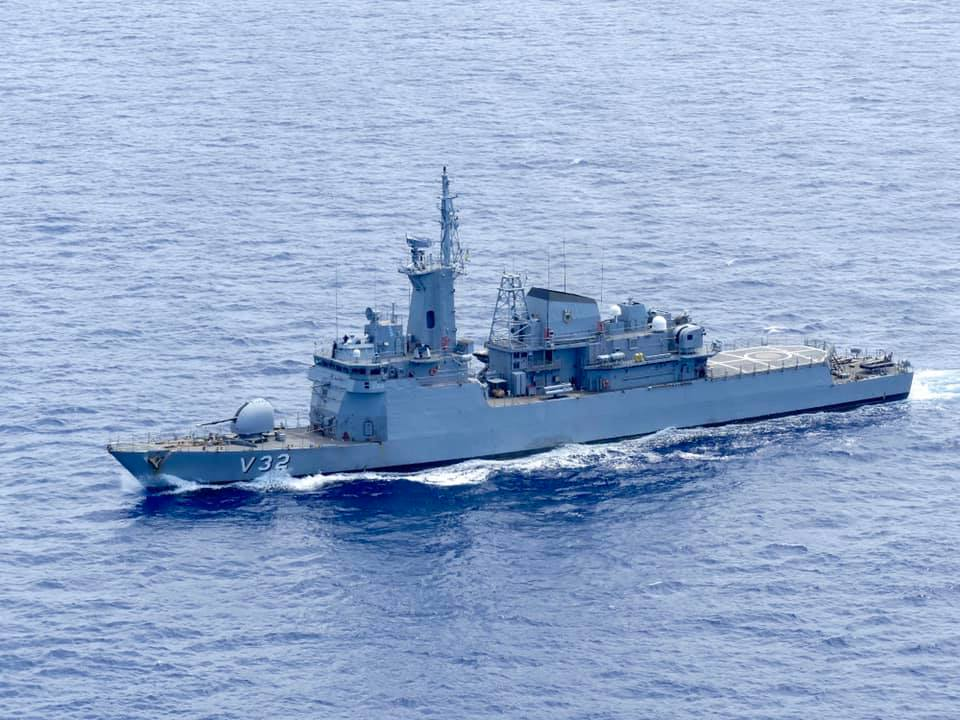
- Júlio de Noronha

History

Brazil
- Name: Júlio de Noronha
- Namesake: Júlio César de Noronha
- Builder: Arsenal de Marinha do Rio de Janeiro
- Launched: 15 December 1989
- Commissioned: 7 October 1992
- Decommissioned: 15 June 2026
- Identification: Pennant number: V32
- Status: Decommissioned

General characteristics
- Class & type: Inhaúma-class corvette
- Displacement: 1,700 t (1,670 long tons) standard; 2,000 t (1,970 long tons) full load
- Length: 95.8 m (314 ft 4 in)
- Beam: 11.4 m (37 ft 5 in)
- Draught: 5.5 m (18 ft 1 in)
- Propulsion: 2 shaft CODOG; 1 GE LM 2500 gas turbine - 20,500 kW (27,500 hp); 2 MTU 16 V 396 TB 91 diesel engines 5,600 kW (7,500 hp)
- Speed: 27 knots (50 km/h; 31 mph)
- Range: 4,000 nmi (7,400 km; 4,600 mi) at 15 knots (28 km/h; 17 mph)
- Complement: 145
- Sensors & processing systems: Plessey AWS-4 radar; Krupp Atlas ASO4 Mod 2 sonar
- Armament: 1 × 114 mm Mark 8 gun; 2 × Bofors 40 mm guns; 4 × Exocet SSMs; 6 × Mark 46 torpedoes
- Aircraft carried: Westland Super Lynx Mk.21B helicopter
- Aviation facilities: Helicopter pad

Júlio de Noronha (V32) is the third ship of the Inhaúma-class corvette of the Brazilian Navy.

== Construction and career ==
The ship was built at Naval Arsenal Rio de Janeiro in Rio de Janeiro and was launched on 15 December 1989 and commissioned on 7 October 1992.

In May 1997, she joined F União and S Tamoio while participating at the invitation of Portugal in NATO's Linked Seas '97 Operation, held offshore between 15 and 19 May of the Iberian Peninsula, between the Portuguese coast and the Strait of Gibraltar. Among other ships, the Amyot D'Inville participated in this exercise. This exercise lasted 68 days and sailed over 12,000 nautical miles, with the GT returning to the Rio de Janeiro Naval Base on June 16.
