= V33 =

V33, or similar, may refer to:

- Brazilian corvette Frontin (V-33)
- Fokker V.33, a German World War I prototype fighter aircraft
- Focke-Wulf Fw 190C V33, a German fighter aircraft of World War II
- ITU-T V.33, a modem standard
- NEC V33, a microprocessor
- Open V33 Grand Lyon, a golf tournament played 1992–1994
