= List of shipwrecks in January 1830 =

The list of shipwrecks in January 1830 includes ships sunk, foundered, grounded, or otherwise lost during January 1830.

== 1 January ==
List of shipwrecks: 1 January 1830
Ship	State	Description
Nimrod	United Kingdom	The barque was wrecked in the Sound of Harris. She was on a voyage from Belfast, County Antrim to Charleston, South Carolina, United States.
Success	United Kingdom	The ship was wrecked in the Colorados Archipelago, Cuba. She was on a voyage from Liverpool, Lancashire to "Mazazas".

== 2 January ==
List of shipwrecks: 2 January 1830
Ship	State	Description
Louisa	United Kingdom	The ship was wrecked near Sunderland, County Durham.

== 7 January ==
List of shipwrecks: 7 January 1830
Ship	State	Description
Waren	United Kingdom	The ship capsized and sank in the North Sea off North Sunderland, County Durham with the loss of all hands. She was on a voyage from North Sunderland to Waren Mill, Northumberland.

== 8 January ==
List of shipwrecks: 8 January 1830
Ship	State	Description
Ocean	United Kingdom	The ship was driven ashore and wrecked at Boston, Lincolnshire. Her crew were rescued.

== 9 January ==
List of shipwrecks: 9 January 1830
Ship	State	Description
Argus	France	The schooner was wrecked at Angra do Heroísmo, Azores, Portugal.
Blamfind	United Kingdom	The schooner was wrecked at Angra do Heroísmo.
Bloye	(United Kingdom of Great Britain and Ireland) Jersey	The schooner was wrecked at Angra do Heroísmo.
Margaret	(United Kingdom of Great Britain and Ireland) Jersey	The schooner was wrecked at Angra do Heroísmo.
Peggy and Eliza	United Kingdom	The schooner was run down and sunk by a brig in Bridlington Bay. Her crew were rescued by the brig.
Prince of Orange	United Kingdom	The schooner was wrecked at Angra do Heroísmo.

== 10 January ==
List of shipwrecks: 10 January 1830
Ship	State	Description
Barbara	United Kingdom	The ship was driven ashore near North Somercotes, Lincolnshire. She was on a voyage from London to Newcastle upon Tyne, Northumberland
Binney	United Kingdom	The ship was driven ashore near North Somercotes.
Ebenezer	United Kingdom	The ship was driven ashore near North Somercotes. She was on a voyage from London to South Shields, County Durham.
Jessie	United Kingdom	The ship was driven ashore near North Somercotes. She was on a voyage from Newcastle upon Tyne to Grimsby, Lincolnshire.
Lady Ann	United Kingdom	The ship was driven ashore near North Somercotes.
Louise	United Kingdom	The ship was driven ashore near North Somercotes.
Mary	United Kingdom	The brig was driven ashore and wrecked at Scrabster, Caithness. Her crew were rescued. She was on a voyage from Newcastle upon Tyne to Dublin.
Mary	United Kingdom	The ship was driven ashore near North Somercotes. She was on a voyage from Berwick upon Tweed to Sunderland, County Durham.
Nancies	United Kingdom	The ship was driven ashore near North Somercotes. She was on a voyage from Elie, Fife to London.
Telemachus	United Kingdom	The ship was driven ashore near North Somercotes.
William & Ann	United Kingdom	The ship was driven ashore near North Somercotes. She was on a voyage from London to Sunderland.
William and Henry	United Kingdom	The ship was wrecked on "Key West", Bahamas with the loss of all but one of her crew.
William and Mary	United Kingdom	The ship was driven ashore and wrecked at Blakeney, Norfolk with the loss of seven of her crew. She was on a voyage from South Shields to London.

== 11 January ==
List of shipwrecks: 11 January 1830
Ship	State	Description
Busy	United Kingdom	The ship was driven ashore at Sandhale, Lincolnshire.
Cambrian	United Kingdom	The ship was wrecked at "Aneati". Her crew were rescued.
Louisa	United Kingdom	The ship was driven ashore at Sandhale.
Mary	United Kingdom	The ship was driven ashore at Sandhale.
Two Brothers	United Kingdom	The sloop was driven ashore and wrecked at Atwick, Yorkshire. She was on a voyage from St. Andrews, Fife to London.
William and Mary	United Kingdom	The ship was driven ashore at Sandhale.

== 12 January ==
List of shipwrecks: 12 January 1830
Ship	State	Description
Alfred	United Kingdom	The ship was driven ashore at Bridlington, Yorkshire.
Mary	United Kingdom	The ship was driven ashore between Hartlepool and Seaton Delaval, County Durham. She was on a voyage from Stockton-on-Tees, County Durham to Newcastle upon Tyne, Northumberland.
Pine	United Kingdom	The ship was driven ashore and wrecked near King's Lynn, Norfolk. She was on a voyage from London to Perth.
Swift	United Kingdom	The ship was lost in the North Sea off the Scroby Sands. She was on a voyage from Newcastle upon Tyne to London.
Zealous	United Kingdom	The ship was driven ashore at Great Yarmouth, Norfolk.

== 13 January ==
List of shipwrecks: 13 January 1830
Ship	State	Description
Aspasia	United States	The ship was driven ashore in the Seine near Havre de Grâce, Seine-Inférieure, France. Her crew were rescued. She was on a voyage from Savannah, Georgia to Havre de Grâce.
Caroline Matilda	United Kingdom	The ship wrecked on the Haisborough Sands, in the North Sea off the coast of Norfolk with the loss of all hands.
Eclipse	United Kingdom	The sloop was driven ashore and sank near Douglas, Isle of Man.
Eliza	United Kingdom	The ship was wrecked on the Barber Sand, in the North Sea off Great Yarmouth, Norfolk with the loss of all hands. She was on a voyage from Perth to London.
Pitcheathly	United Kingdom	The ship was wrecked on the Barnard Sand, in the North Sea off Great Yarmouth. Her crew were rescued. She was on a voyage from Perth to London.
Request	United Kingdom	The collier was driven ashore and wrecked at Filey, Yorkshire. Her crew were rescued by rocket apparatus.
Valentine	United Kingdom	The ship was driven ashore and wrecked at Pakefield, Suffolk. Her crew were rescued.
Vine	United Kingdom	The sloop was wrecked on the Woolpack Sand, in The Wash. Her four crew were rescued. She was on a voyage from Perth to London.

== 14 January ==
List of shipwrecks: 14 January 1830
Ship	State	Description
Eclipse	United Kingdom	The sloop was driven ashore and wrecked at Castle Mona, Douglas, Isle of Man. Four of her seven crew reached land in the ship's boat. The other three were rescued by the Ramsey Lifeboat, which was then fitting out at Douglas. Eclipse was on a voyage from Liverpool. Lancashire to Glasgow, Renfrewshire.
Hope	United Kingdom	The ship sank at Blakeney, Norfolk. She was on a voyage from Bo'ness, Lothian to Blakeney.
Jeune Prosper	France	The ship was wrecked in a hurricane at Saint-Denis, Réunion. Her crew were rescued.
Nestor	France	The ship was wrecked in a hurricane at Sainte-Marie, Réunion. Her crew were rescued.
New Danby	United Kingdom	The ship was driven ashore and wrecked at Bridlington, Yorkshire.
Pitcheathly	United Kingdom	The ship was wrecked on the Barnard Sand, in the North Sea of Great Yarmouth, Norfolk. Her crew were rescued. She was on a voyage from Perth to London.

== 15 January ==
List of shipwrecks: 15 January 1830
Ship	State	Description
Elvira	United Kingdom	The ship was abandoned in the Atlantic Ocean. Her crew were rescued by a Portuguese brig. She was on a voyage from Sierra Leone to Plymouth, Devon.
Friendschap	flag unknown	The ship foundered in the North Sea off Robin Hoods Bay, Yorkshire, United Kingdom with the loss of all hands.
Kempt	United Kingdom	The ship was wrecked near Sambro, Nova Scotia, British North America. She was on a voyage from Jamaica to Halifax, Nova Scotia.

== 16 January ==
List of shipwrecks: 16 January 1830
Ship	State	Description
Alacrity	United Kingdom	The ship ran aground on the Barber Sand in the North Sea. She was refloated but found to be leaky and was consequently beached at Great Yarmouth. Her crew were rescued. Alacrity was on a voyage from London to Newcastle upon Tyne, Northumberland.

== 18 January ==
List of shipwrecks: 18 January 1830
Ship	State	Description
London	United Kingdom	The ship was driven ashore near Margate, Kent.
Mary	United Kingdom	The ship was driven ashore at Weymouth, Dorset. She was on a voyage from Youghal, County Cork to Southampton, Hampshire.
Warrior	United Kingdom	The ship was driven ashore and wrecked at "Laguira".

== 19 January ==
List of shipwrecks: 19 January 1830
Ship	State	Description
Anna Catherina	Hamburg	The ship was wrecked on Heligoland. She was on a voyage from Newcastle-upon-Tyne, Northumberland. United Kingdom to Hamburg.
George the Fourth	United Kingdom	The ship was driven ashore and wrecked near Brixham, Devon. Her crew were rescued. She was on a voyage from London to Waterford.
Hope	United Kingdom	The ship was wrecked in the Isles of Scilly. Five of her crew were rescued. She was on a voyage from Sierra Leone to London.
Mary	United Kingdom	The ship was driven ashore at Weymouth, Dorset. She was on a voyage from Youghal, County Cork to Southampton, Hampshire
Moss Rose	United Kingdom	The ship foundered in the North Sea off Tetney, Lincolnshire with the loss of two of her four crew. She was on a voyage from Barton-upon-Humber, Lincolnshire to King's Lynn, Norfolk.

== 20 January ==
List of shipwrecks: 20 January 1830
Ship	State	Description
Aboyne	United Kingdom	The ship was driven ashore at Sunderland, County Durham. She was later refloated.
Acorn	United Kingdom	The ship was driven ashore at Hendon, County Durham. She was later refloated.
Advena	United Kingdom	The ship was driven ashore at Hendon. She was later refloated.
Ann	United Kingdom	The ship was driven ashore at Hendon.
Ann	United Kingdom	The ship was driven ashore at Bridlington, Yorkshire. Her crew were rescued.
Bee	United Kingdom	The ship was driven ashore and severely damaged at Sutton-on-Sea, Lincolnshire. She was on a voyage from London to King's Lynn, Norfolk She was refloated in mid-February and taken in to Boston, Lincolnshire.
Boreas	United Kingdom	The ship was driven ashore at Hendon.
Britannia	United Kingdom	The ship was driven ashore and wrecked at Hendon.
Catharine	United Kingdom	The ship was driven ashore and wrecked at Sutton-on-Sea. She was on a voyage from Wells-next-the-Sea, Norfolk to London.
Charles	United Kingdom	The ship was driven ashore at Sunderland.
Charlotte	United Kingdom	The ship was driven ashore and wrecked at Sunderland.
Endeavour	United Kingdom	The ship was driven ashore at Hendon. She was later refloated.
Frederick	United Kingdom	The ship was driven ashore at Hendon. She was later refloated.
Good Design	United Kingdom	The ship was driven ashore at Stockton-on-Tees, County Durham.
Greenwood	United Kingdom	The ship was driven ashore at Owthorne, Yorkshire. She was on a voyage from Wells-next-the-Sea, Norfolk to Sunderland. Greenwood was refloated in mid-February and taken in to Hull, Yorkshire.
Iris	United Kingdom	The ship was driven ashore at Owthorne. She broke up on 23 January. Iris was on a voyage from London to Sunderland.
James and Elizabeth	United Kingdom	The ship was driven ashore at "Carden". She was on a voyage from London to Newcastle upon Tyne.
Jane	United Kingdom	The ship was driven ashore at the mouth of the Tees. Her crew were rescued by the Stockton-on-Tees Lifeboat. She was later refloated.
La Constance	France	The lugger was driven ashore and wrecked at Fairlight, Sussex, United Kingdom with the loss of one of her twelve crew. She on a voyage from Le Tréport to Dieppe, Seine-Inférieure.
Liberty	(United Kingdom of Great Britain and Ireland) New South Wales	The schooner was wrecked on the Sow and Pigs Reef, off the mouth of the Manning River.
Louisa	United Kingdom	The ship was driven ashore and wrecked at Sunderland.
Marks and Ann	United Kingdom	The ship was driven ashore at Hendon. She was later refloated.
Mary	United Kingdom	The ship was driven ashore at the mouth of the Tees. She was on a voyage from Newcastle upon Tyne, Northumberland to Stockton-on-Tees, County Durham.
Mary	United Kingdom	The ship was wrecked at Blyth, Northumberland with the loss of all but her captain.
Mary	United Kingdom	The ship was driven ashore at Owthorne.
Messenger	United Kingdom	The ship was driven ashore and wrecked at Sunderland.
Militia	United Kingdom	The ship was driven ashore at Sunderland. She later became a wreck.
Nile	United Kingdom	The ship was driven ashore at Hornsea, Yorkshire. She was on a voyage from Rochester, Kent to Sunderland.
Pallion	United Kingdom	The ship was driven ashore at Stranton, County Durham. She was later refloated.
Robin Hood	United Kingdom	The ship was driven ashore at the mouth of the Tees. Her crew were rescued by the Stockton-on-Tees Lifeboat. She was later refloated.
Salisbury	United Kingdom	The ship was driven ashore at Seaton, County Durham.
Severn	United Kingdom	The ship was driven ashore and wrecked at Sunderland.
Sheffield	United Kingdom	The ship was driven ashore and wrecked at Aldeburgh, Suffolk with the loss of all hands.
Thomas	United Kingdom	The ship was driven ashore and wrecked at Sizewell, Suffolk with the loss of all but one of her crew. She was on a voyage from Poole, Dorset to Hull, Yorkshire.
Thomas and Mary	United Kingdom	The ship was driven ashore at Hartlepool, County Durham. She was later refloated.
Thomas and Mary	United Kingdom	The ship ran aground on the Skegness Middle Sand, in the North Sea off the coast of Lincolnshire and foundered with the loss of all but two of her crew. Survivors were rescued by the Gibraltar Point Lifeboat.
Thomas Burdon	United Kingdom	The ship was driven ashore at Owthorne. She was on a voyage from London to Sunderland.
Union	United Kingdom	The ship was driven ashore at Skipsea, Yorkshire. Her crew were rescued. She was on a voyage from Great Yarmouth, Norfolk to Newcastle upon Tyne.
William and Betsey	United Kingdom	The ship was driven ashore and wrecked at Hendon. Her crew were rescued.

== 21 January ==
List of shipwrecks: 21 January 1830
Ship	State	Description
Adele	Netherlands	The brig was driven ashore and wrecked at Prawle Point, Devon, United Kingdom with the loss of all hands.
Ambrook	United Kingdom	The ship was driven ashore and wrecked at Plymouth, Devon.
Charlotte	United Kingdom	The ship was driven ashore and wrecked near Hendon, County Durham. Her crew were rescued by the Sunderland Lifeboat.
Clifton	United Kingdom	The ship was driven ashore near South Shields, county Durham.
Euphemia	United Kingdom	The ship was lost at "Lavie". Her crew were rescued. She was on a voyage from Van Diemen's Land to Mauritius via Timor.
Fame	United Kingdom	The smack was driven ashore and wrecked near Aberdeen with the loss of two of the eighteen people on board. Survivors were rescued with the aid of rocket apparatus. She was on a voyage from London to Inverness.
Glatton	United Kingdom	The ship was wrecked on the Spanish Battery Rocks, North Shields, County Durham. Her crew were rescued.
Graces	United Kingdom	The ship was driven ashore near Easington, County Durham. She was on a voyage from South Shields, County Durham to London. Graces was refloated in mid-February and taken in to Hull, Yorkshire.
Humbrock	United Kingdom	The schooner was driven ashore and wrecked at Plymouth, Devon.
Louisa	United Kingdom	The ship was driven ashore and wrecked at Sunderland, County Durham.
Melita	United Kingdom	The ship was driven ashore and wrecked at Sunderland.
Nelson	United Kingdom	The ship was driven ashore at St. Margarets Bay, Kent. She was on a voyage from London to Cork.]
Pomona	United Kingdom	The ship was driven ashore and damaged at Lowestoft, Suffolk. She was refloated on 11 February and taken in to Great Yarmouth, Norfolk.
Severn	United Kingdom	The ship was driven ashore and wrecked near Hendon. Her crew were rescued by the Sunderland Lifeboat.
The South Shields Lifeboat	(United Kingdom of Great Britain and Ireland) National Institution for the Preservation of Life from Shipwreck	The lifeboat was wrecked on the Spanish Battery Rocks whilst going to the aid of Glatton. Her crew were rescued.

== 22 January ==
List of shipwrecks: 22 January 1830
Ship	State	Description
Grampian	United Kingdom	The brig was wrecked at Aberdeen with the loss of two of her crew. She was on a voyage from South Shields, County Durham to Aberdeen.
Lord Nelson	United Kingdom	The ship struck the Cannon Rock and sank with the loss of all but one of her crew. She was on a voyage from Dublin to Irvine, Ayrshire.

== 25 January ==
List of shipwrecks: 25 January 1830
Ship	State	Description
Providence	United Kingdom	The ship was driven ashore and wrecked at "Barber's Point". She was on a voyage from Cardiff, Glamorgan to Constantinople, Ottoman Empire.
St. Vincent	United Kingdom	The ship ran aground off Demerara. She was on a voyage from Demerara to Glasgow, Renfrewshire.

== 26 January ==
List of shipwrecks: 26 January 1830
Ship	State	Description
Hope	United Kingdom	The brig was wrecked on St Martin's, Isles of Scilly with the loss of more than four lives. She was on a voyage from Africa to London.

== 27 January ==
List of shipwrecks: 27 January 1830
Ship	State	Description
Bella Maria	Portugal	The schooner was abandoned off Madeira.

== 29 January ==
List of shipwrecks: 29 January 1830
Ship	State	Description
Catharine and Anne	United Kingdom	The ship was wrecked on the Whitby Rock, Yorkshire. Her crew were rescued.
William and George	United Kingdom	The ship was driven on to the Whitby Rock.

== 30 January ==
List of shipwrecks: 30 January 1830
Ship	State	Description
Aurora	United Kingdom	The ship ran aground on the Barnard Sand, in the North Sea off Great Yarmouth, Norfolk. She capsized and sank.
Courier de Marseille	France	The ship was wrecked at Arles, Bouches-du-Rhône.
Elizabeth and Mary	United Kingdom	The ship was lost on the Heaps Sand, in the North Sea off the coast of Essex.
George Green	United Kingdom	The East Indiaman ran aground on the Haisborough Sands and subsequently foundered. She was on a voyage from Newcastle upon Tyne, Northumberland to London.

== 31 January ==
List of shipwrecks: 31 January 1830
Ship	State	Description
Vivid	United Kingdom	The ship was wrecked on the Shipwash Sand, in the North Sea off the coast of Essex. Her crew were rescued. She was on a voyage from Newcastle upon Tyne, Northumberland to London.

== Unknown date ==
List of shipwrecks: Unknown date 1830
Ship	State	Description
Ann	United Kingdom	The brig was driven ashore and wrecked at Mappleton. Yorkshire in late January with the loss of three of her four crew.
Arun	United Kingdom	The ship was driven ashore at Bridlington, Yorkshire. She was on a voyage from Great Yarmouth, Norfolk to Dunbar, Lothian.
Better Luck Still	United Kingdom	The ship foundered in the North Sea off the coast of Yorkshire. She was on a voyage from Saint Petersburg, Russia to London.
Black Swan	(United Kingdom of Great Britain and Ireland) New South Wales	The schooner was wrecked on Kangaroo Island.
Francis	United Kingdom	The brig was driven ashore at Harwich, Essex before 12 January.
Gustas Brandt	flag unknown	The ship was driven ashore near Arkhangelsk, Russia. She was on a voyage from Arkhangelsk to Liverpool, Lancashire, United Kingdom.
Hero	United Kingdom	The ship was abandoned off the Azores, Portugal after 8 January.
Jean	United Kingdom	The ship foundered in the North Sea off Domesnes, Norway. Her crew were rescued.
La Petite Auguste	France	The ship was wrecked near Hourtin, Gironde with the loss of all but two or three of her crew.
Mermaid	(United Kingdom of Great Britain and Ireland) New South Wales	The schooner was wrecked in the Torres Straits (17°0′7″S 146°0′10″E).
Neeltna Jantina	Netherlands	The ship was abandoned in the North Sea 25 nautical miles (46 km) off Lindesnes, Norway. She was on a voyage from Newcastle upon Tyne, Northumberland, United Kingdom to Dordrecht, South Holland.
Nymph	United Kingdom	The ship was driven ashore near Conwy, Caernarfonshire.
Providence	United Kingdom	The ship was sailed from Hayle, Cornwall for Llanelli, Glamorgan. No further trace, presumed foundered with the loss of all hands.
Smales	United Kingdom	The ship was driven ashore at Whitby, Yorkshire. Her crew were rescued.
Telescope	United Kingdom	The ship was wrecked on North Uist, Outer Hebrides. She was on a voyage from the Clyde to Sligo.
Thomas	United Kingdom	The ship was driven ashore at "Curthorpe".
