= V31 =

V31 may refer to:

- Autovía V-31, a road in Spain
- Brazilian corvette Jaceguai (V-31)
- Fokker V.31, a German towplane
