= Brazilian corvette Barroso =

Warship of the Brazilian Navy

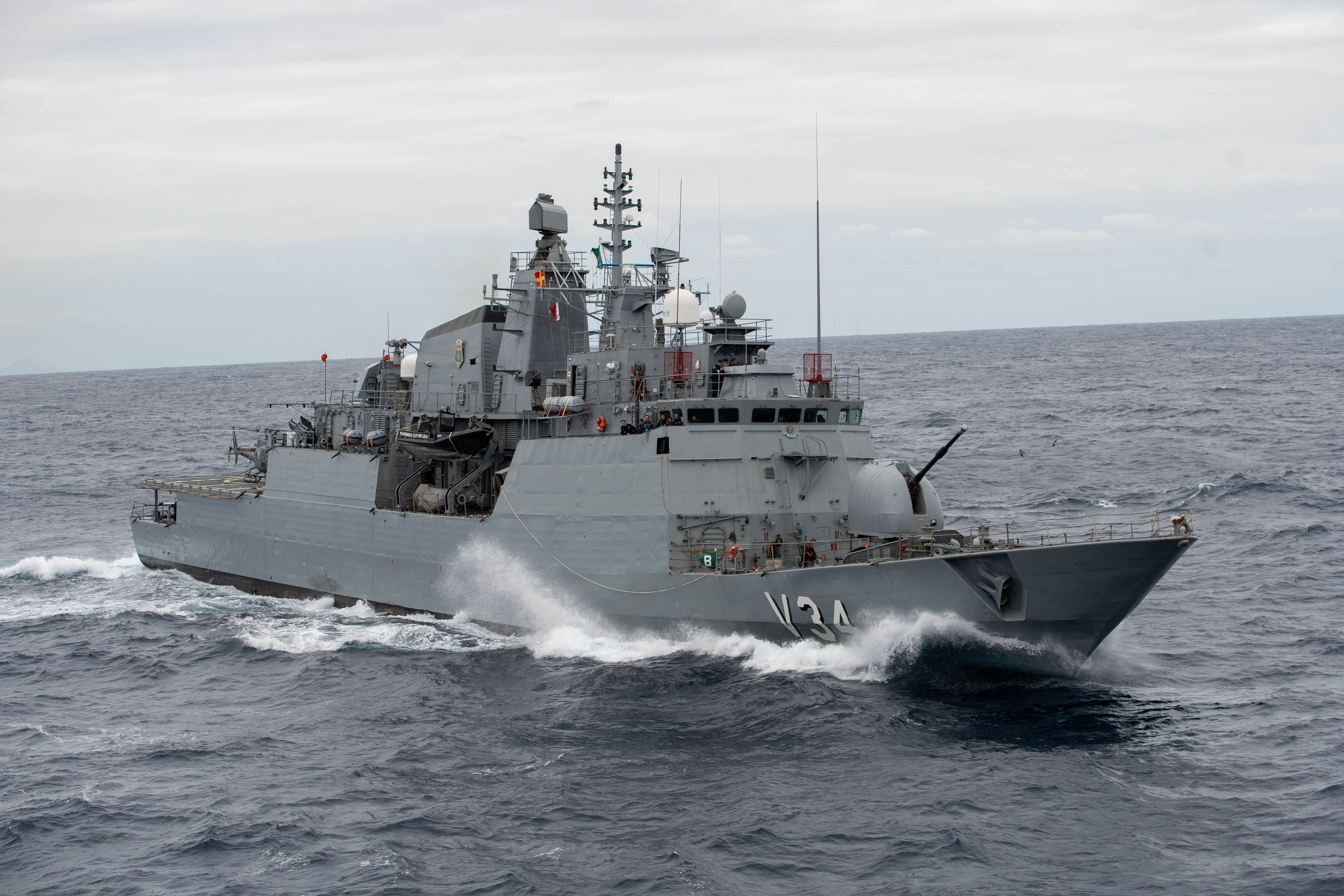
- Barroso

History

Brazil
- Name: Barroso
- Namesake: Francisco Manoel Barroso da Silva
- Operator: Brazilian Navy; Military of Equatorial Guinea
- Ordered: 1993
- Builder: Arsenal de Marinha do Rio de Janeiro
- Laid down: 21 December 1994
- Launched: 20 December 2002
- Commissioned: 19 August 2008
- Identification: MMSI number: 710450000; Callsign: PWBS; Pennant number: V34
- Status: Active

General characteristics
- Class & type: Barroso-class corvette
- Displacement: 1,814 t (1,785 long tons) standard; 2,390 t (2,350 long tons) full load
- Length: 103.4 m (339 ft)
- Beam: 11.4 m (37 ft)
- Draught: 5.3 m (17 ft)
- Propulsion: 1 × General Electric LM2500 gas turbine (27,490 shp) and 2 × MTU 1163 TB93 diesel engines driving two shafts with controllable pitch propellers in CODOG configuration
- Speed: 27+ knots (50+ km/h); 20.5 knots (38 km/h) on diesels alone
- Range: 4,000 nautical miles (7,000 km) at 15 knots (28 km/h)
- Complement: 154 (~25 officers, 125 enlisted)
- Sensors & processing systems: Alenia RAN-20S radar; Krupp Atlas EDO-997C sonar; Terma Scanter surface search radar; Decca TM 1226C navigation radar; Orion RTX-30 fire control radar; Saab EOS-400 optronic director
- Electronic warfare & decoys: Cutlass B1W ESM; ET/SQL-1 ECM; 12 × 102 mm decoy launchers
- Armament: 1 × 114 mm Mark 8 gun; 1 × Bofors 40 mm guns; 4 × Exocet SSMs; 6 × Mark 46 torpedoes
- Aircraft carried: Westland Super Lynx Mk.21B helicopter
- Aviation facilities: Helicopter pad

Barroso (V34) is a corvette of the Brazilian Navy, and the lead ship of its sub class. The fifth Brazilian warship to be named after Admiral Francisco Manoel Barroso da Silva, Barroso was launched on 20 December 2002 and commissioned on 19 August 2008.

== Service history ==
On 4 September 2015 the corvette Barroso rescued 220 Syrian migrants in the Mediterranean Sea, as reported by the Ministry of Defense in a statement released on its website. The Brazilian ship was sailing towards Beirut in Lebanon to replace the frigate União as the flagship of the Maritime Task Force (MTF) of the United Nations Interim Force in Lebanon (UNIFIL) when it received an alert from the Italian Maritime Rescue Coordination Centre (MRCC) about a sinking vessel taking immigrants to Europe.

On 27 November 2018 she fired the first Mansup prototype.

Barroso took part in the ninth edition of IBSAMAR led by the Indian Navy with the South African Navy in the Simon’s Town and False Bay areas of South Africa from 8 to 21 October 2026.

== Potential foreign sales and upgrades ==
In July 2010, after the visit of Brazilian president, Luiz Inácio Lula da Silva to Equatorial Guinea, an order for a Barroso-class corvette was announced. However, as of 2014 no further news has been announced.

In 2015, EMGEPRON displayed at the LAAD 2015 trade show a model of the Tamandaré-class corvette, a proposed upgrade to Barroso.
