= V30 =

V30 may refer to:

- Autovía V-30, a road in Spain
- Brazilian corvette Inhaúma (V-30)
- Fokker V.30, a German glider
- Honda VF500C Magna V30, a motorcycle
- LG V30, a smartphone
- NEC V30, a microprocessor
- SMS V30, a torpedo boat of the Imperial German Navy
- Toyota Camry (V30), a Japanese car
