= V34 =

V34, or similar, may refer to:

- Brazilian corvette Barroso (V34)
- ITU-T V.34, a modem standard
- Fokker V.34, a German prototype fighter aircraft of World War I
