= Brazilian submarine Timbira =

Tupi-class submarines

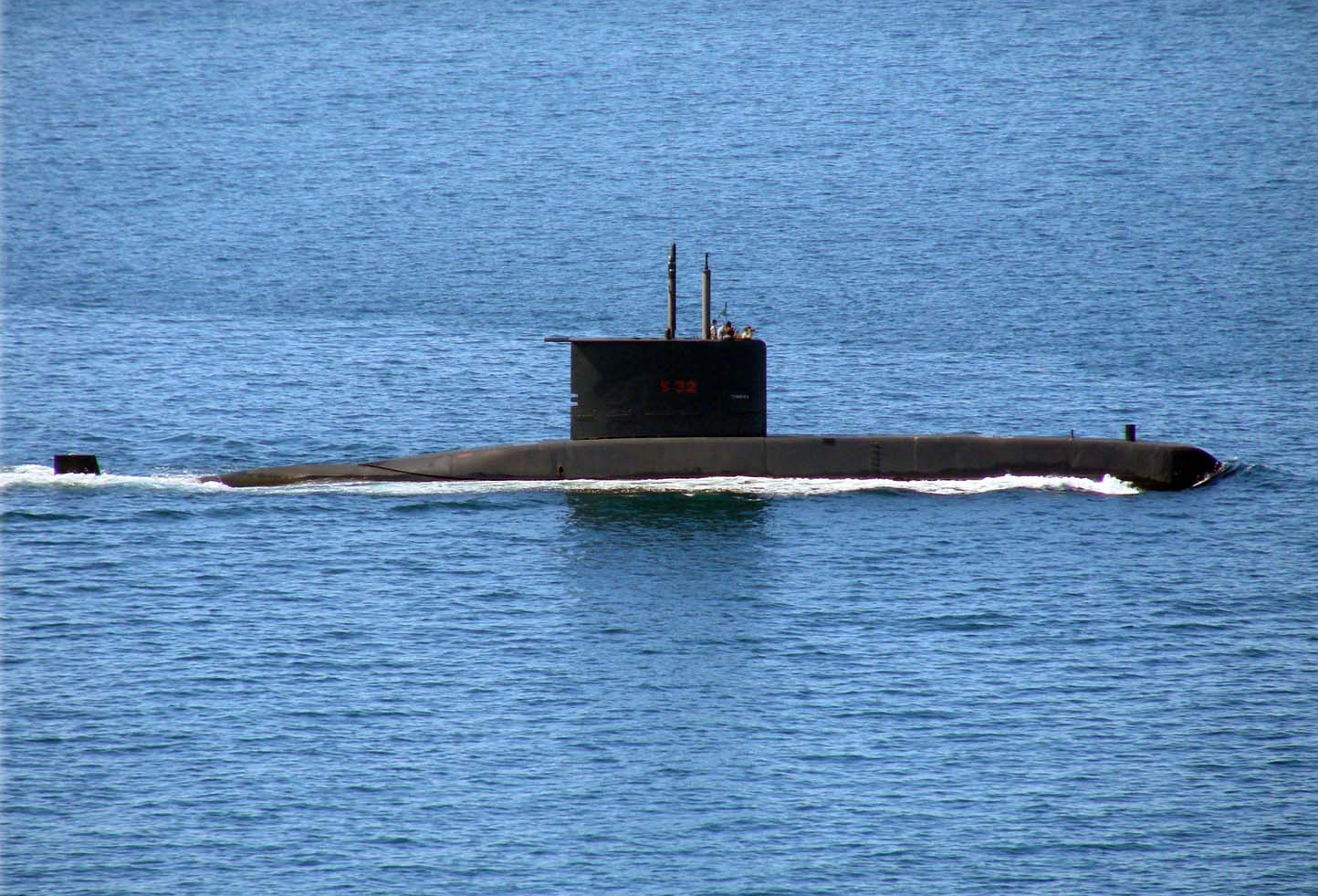
- S Timbira

History

Brazil
- Name: Timbira
- Namesake: Timbira
- Builder: Arsenal de Marinha do Rio de Janeiro
- Laid down: 15 September 1987
- Launched: 5 January 1996
- Commissioned: 16 December 1996
- Decommissioned: 17 February 2023
- Identification: Pennant number: S-32
- Status: Sunk as target

General characteristics
- Class & type: Tupi-class submarine
- Displacement: 1,170 t (1,150 long tons) surfaced; 1,460 t (1,440 long tons) submerged
- Length: 61.2 m (200 ft 9 in)
- Beam: 6.25 m (20 ft 6 in)
- Draft: 5.5 m (18 ft 1 in)
- Propulsion: 4 ×diesel-electric engines; 1 × shaft, 4,500 kW (6,100 shp)
- Speed: 11 kn (20 kilometres per hour; 13 miles per hour) surfaced; 22 kn (41 km/h; 25 mph) submerged
- Range: 11,000 nmi (20,000 km; 13,000 mi) at 19 km/h (10 kn) surfaced; 8,000 nmi (15,000 km; 9,200 mi) at 19 km/h (10 kn) snorkeling; 400 nmi (740 km; 460 mi) at 7 km/h (4 kn) submerged
- Endurance: 50 days
- Test depth: 500 m (1,600 ft)
- Complement: 30
- Armament: 8 × 21 in (533 mm) torpedo tubes, 14 × torpedoes; optional UGM-84 Harpoon integration

Timbira (S32) was the third Tupi-class submarine of the Brazilian Navy.

== Construction and career ==
The boat was built at Arsenal de Marinha do Rio de Janeiro in Rio de Janeiro and was launched on 5 January 1996 and commissioned on 16 December 1996. The boat was decommissioned on 17 February 2023. She is being planned to be used as a target in a ship sinking naval exercise by the Brazilian Navy in 2026.

Timbira sunk as target during a SINKEX in April 2026.

== Gallery ==
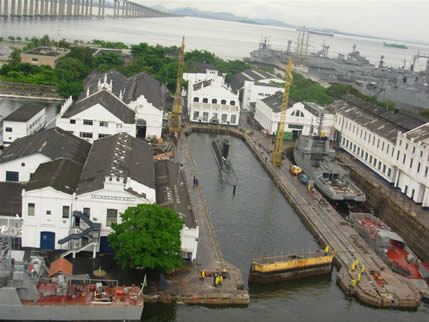

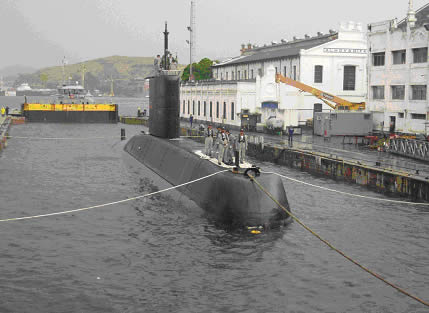

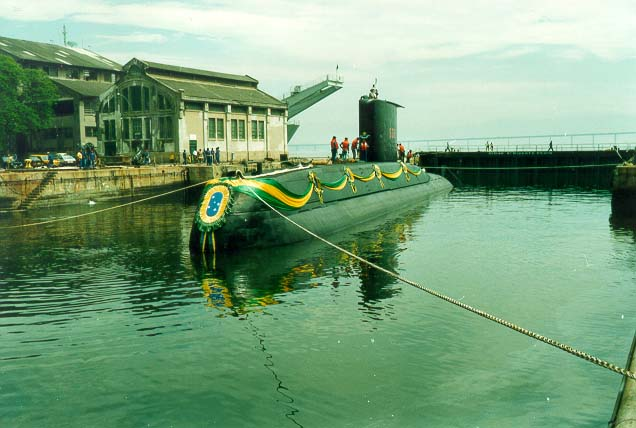

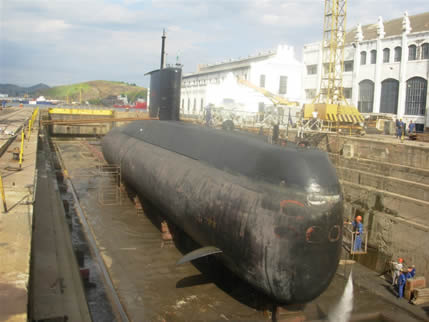
