= Ilha das Cobras =

Island in Guanabara Bay, Rio de Janeiro, Brazil

Coordinates: 22°53′42″S 43°10′20″W

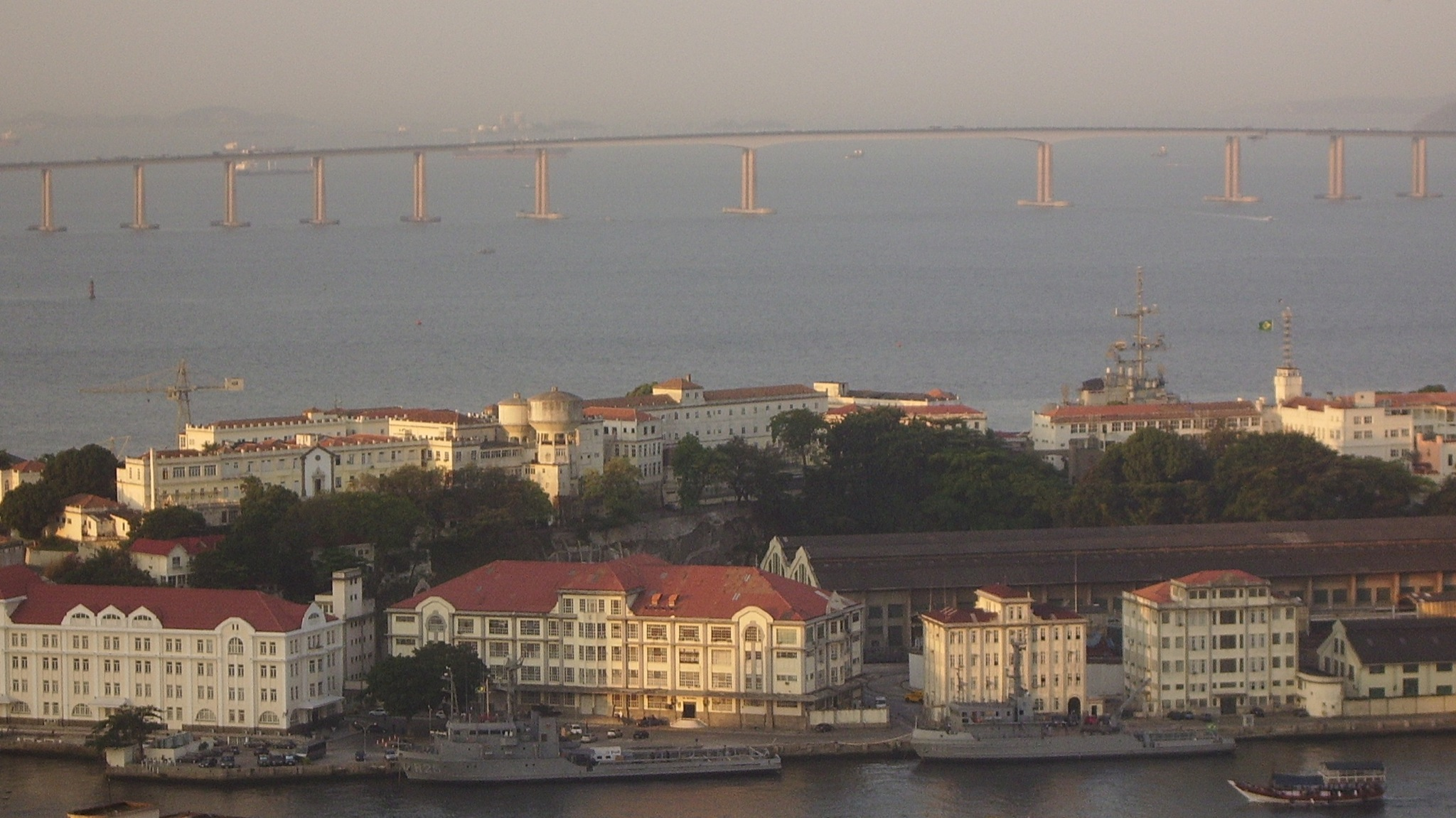
Ilha das Cobras, Rio de Janeiro: panoramic view of the complex with the Arsenal de Marinha do Rio de Janeiro. In the background is the Rio–Niterói Bridge.

Ilha das Cobras (Portuguese for 'Isle of the Snakes') is an island located within Guanabara Bay in the city and state of Rio de Janeiro, Brazil. It is east of the neighborhood Guanabara. It is home to the Arsenal de Marinha do Rio de Janeiro base of the Brazilian Navy.

== See also ==
- List of islands of Brazil
