= Brazilian corvette Jaceguai =

Inhaúma-class corvettes

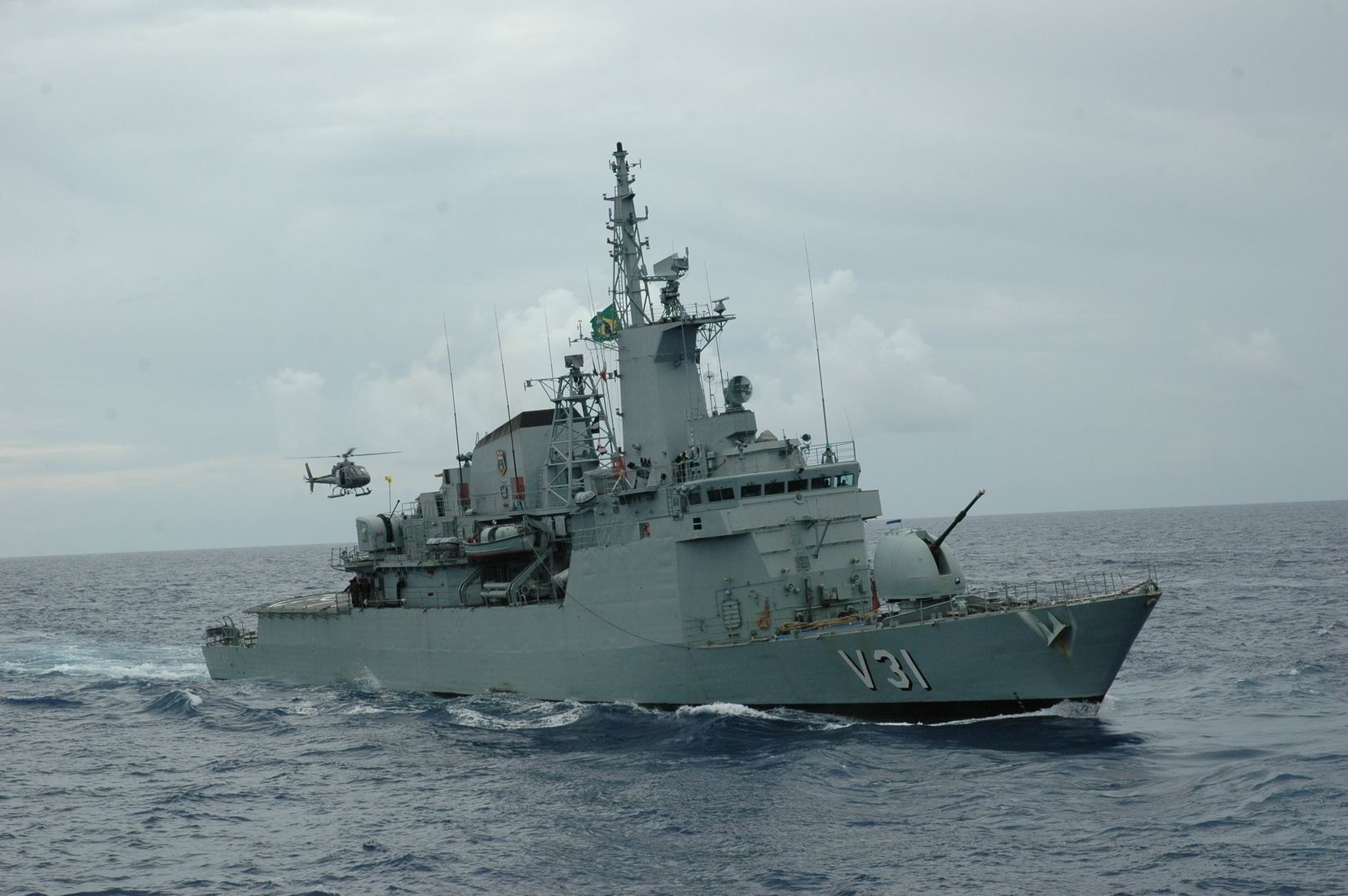
- Jaceguai

History

Brazil
- Name: Jaceguai
- Namesake: Artur Silveira da Mota, Baron of Jaceguai
- Builder: Arsenal de Marinha do Rio de Janeiro
- Launched: 8 June 1987
- Commissioned: 2 April 1991
- Decommissioned: 18 September 2019
- Identification: Pennant number: V31
- Fate: Sunk as target, 2021

General characteristics
- Class & type: Inhaúma-class corvette
- Displacement: 1,700 t (1,670 long tons) standard; 2,000 t (1,970 long tons) full load
- Length: 95.8 m (314 ft 4 in)
- Beam: 11.4 m (37 ft 5 in)
- Draught: 5.5 m (18 ft 1 in)
- Propulsion: 2 shaft CODOG; 1 GE LM 2500 gas turbine - 20,500 kW (27,500 hp); 2 MTU 16 V 396 TB 91 diesel engines 5,600 kW (7,500 hp)
- Speed: 27 knots (50 km/h; 31 mph)
- Range: 4,000 nmi (7,400 km; 4,600 mi) at 15 knots (28 km/h; 17 mph)
- Complement: 145
- Sensors & processing systems: Plessey AWS-4 radar; Krupp Atlas ASO4 Mod 2 sonar
- Armament: 1 × 114 mm Mark 8 gun; 2 × Bofors 40 mm guns; 4 × Exocet SSMs; 6 × Mark 46 torpedoes
- Aircraft carried: Westland Super Lynx Mk.21B helicopter
- Aviation facilities: Helicopter pad

Jaceguai (V31) was the second ship of the Inhaúma-class corvette of the Brazilian Navy.

== Construction and career ==
The ship was built at Naval Arsenal Rio de Janeiro in Rio de Janeiro and was launched on 8 June 1987 and commissioned on 2 April 1991.

She was decommissioned on 18 September 2019.

During MISSILEX on 24 June 2021, an AM-39 Exocet anti-ship missile was launched from an AH-15B helicopter against the former Jaceguai's hull which later sank.
