= Inhaúma-class corvette =

Brazilian warship class (1989–present)

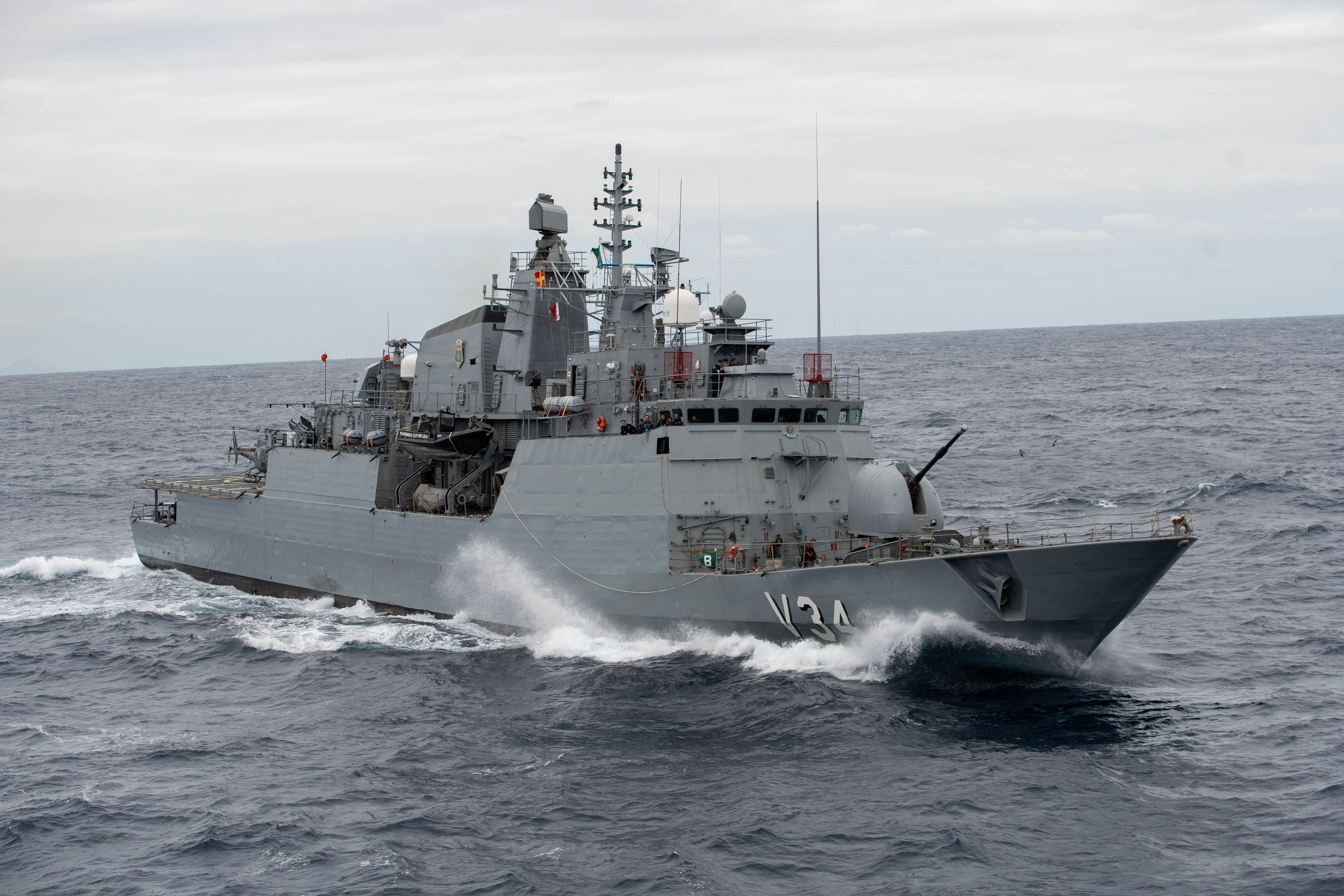
- Barroso

Class overview
- Name: Inhaúma class
- Builders: Rio de Janeiro Navy Arsenal
- Operators: Brazilian Navy
- Succeeded by: Tamandaré class
- Subclasses: Barroso
- Built: 1983–2002
- In commission: 1989–present
- Completed: 5
- Active: 1
- Retired: 4 (3 sunk as targets)

General characteristics as built
- Type: Corvette
- Displacement: 1,700 t (1,670 long tons) standard; 2,000 t (1,970 long tons) full load
- Length: 95.8 m (314 ft 4 in)
- Beam: 11.4 m (37 ft 5 in)
- Draught: 5.5 m (18 ft 1 in)
- Propulsion: 2 shaft CODOG; 1 GE LM 2500 gas turbine - 20,500 kW (27,500 hp); 2 MTU 16 V 396 TB 91 diesel engines 5,600 kW (7,500 hp)
- Speed: 27 knots (50 km/h; 31 mph)
- Range: 4,000 nmi (7,400 km; 4,600 mi) at 15 knots (28 km/h; 17 mph)
- Complement: 145
- Sensors & processing systems: Inhaúma; Plessey AWS-4 radar; Krupp Atlas ASO4 Mod 2 sonar; Barroso; Alenia RAN-20S radar; Krupp Atlas EDO-997C sonar; Terma Scanter surface search radar; Decca TM 1226C navigation radar; Orion RTX-30 fire control radar; Saab EOS-400 optronic director
- Armament: 1 × 114 mm Mark 8 gun; 2 × Bofors 40 mm guns (1 on Barroso); 4 × Exocet SSMs; 6 × Mark 46 torpedoes
- Aircraft carried: Westland Super Lynx Mk.21B helicopter
- Aviation facilities: Helicopter pad

The Inhaúma class are a series of five corvettes operated by the Brazilian Navy. These ships were built in Brazil and designed with assistance from the German company Marine Technik. It was originally planned to build 12 to 16 ships but the economic situation in Brazil did not permit this and only five vessels were built. The first two ships were constructed at the Rio de Janeiro Navy Arsenal, the second pair by Verolme. The programme was considerably delayed due to funding issues and the Brazilian Verolme yard's insolvency in 1991 which forced Júlio de Noronha and Frontin to be completed by the Navy Arsenal. The first ship entered service in 1989 and the last in 2008. Three of the five ships have been taken out of service and one was sunk in a missile exercise in the Atlantic Ocean in 2016.

== Design and description ==
The Inhaúma class were initially designed as small frigates by the Brazilian Naval Design Office with assistance from the West German company Marine Technik. As built the class had a standard displacement of 1,700 tonnes (1,670 long tons) and 2,000 tonnes (1,970 long tons) at full load. The Inhaúma-class ships measured 90 metres (295 ft 3 in) long between perpendiculars and 95.8 metres (314 ft 4 in) overall with a beam of 11.4 metres (37 ft 5 in) and a draught of 5.5 metres (18 ft 1 in). The vessels in the class are powered by a combined diesel or gas (CODOG) system composed of one GE LM 2500 gas turbine rated at 20,500 kilowatts (27,500 hp) and two MTU 16 V 396 TB 94 diesel engines rated at 5,800 kW (7,800 bhp) turning two shafts. This gives the Inhaúma class a maximum speed of 27 knots (50 km/h; 31 mph) and a range of 4,000 nautical miles (7,400 km; 4,600 mi) at 15 knots (28 km/h; 17 mph). Over time, the standard displacement decreased to 1,600 tonnes (1,600 long tons) and the full load displacement increased to 2,170 tonnes (2,140 long tons). The initial complement was 162 including 19 officers but this too decreased over time to 145 including 15 officers.

The class is armed with four Exocet surface-to-surface missiles (SSM) placed centrally and a Mk 8 114 mm (4.5 in) gun situated forward. They are equipped with two Bofors 40 mm (1.6 in)/70 anti-aircraft (AA) guns in a twin mount atop the aft superstructure. For anti-submarine warfare, the vessels mount Mk 32 324 mm (13 in) torpedo tubes in two triple mounts sited on either side of the superstructure for Mk 46 torpedoes. A helicopter pad is located at the stern of the ship and is capable of operating a Westland Super Lynx helicopter. During the design phase, a Vulcan Phalanx close-in weapon system (CIWS) was intended for the stern. However, the class was considered top heavy and the idea was scrapped with the possibility of a surface-to-air missile mount in place instead. Further vessels were planned to have indigenous Brazilian missiles but this was shelved.

For sensors the Inhaúma class are fitted with Plessey AWS-4, Kelvin Hughes Type 1007 and Selenia Orion RTN 10X radar and Krupp Atlas ASO4 Mod 2 sonar. For electronic countermeasures, the vessels mount IPqM/Elabra Defensor ET SLR-1X radar intercept and IPqM/Elabra ET SLQ-1 radar jammers. They also mount two Plessey Shield chaff countermeasures. The ships have Ferranti CAAIS 450 (Computer Aided Action Information System) combat data systems and a SAAB EOS-400 fire control system.

=== Barroso subclass ===
An improved Inhaúma-class vessel, Barroso, was ordered as a follow-on to the original class. The vessel has a standard displacement of 1,814 tonnes (1,785 long tons) and 2,390 tonnes (2,350 long tons) at full load. The vessel is 4.5 metres (14 ft 9 in) longer than the standard Inhaúma class, being 103.4 metres (339 ft 3 in) long overall with a beam of 11.4 metres (37 ft 5 in) and a draught of 5.3 metres (17 ft 5 in). This was done to improve the design's seakeeping and enlarge the engine room spaces. Barroso uses the same CODOG machinery setup as the basic Inhaúma-class ship and the same later complement of 145. Barroso carries the same missile and main gun, but secondary armament comprises a Bofors 40 mm/70 SAK Sea Trinity CIWS, two 12.7 mm (0.5 in) machine guns and six ARES/DSAM SLT 324 mm torpedo tubes for the Mk 46 torpedoes.

Other design changes include a different combat data system in the IPqM/Esca Siconta Mk III system with Link YB. The fire control system is the Saab/Combitech EOS-400. The radar consists of the AESN RAN 20S surface search, the Terma Scanter 4100 navigational and the AESN RTN 30-Y for fire control. Sonar is the EDO 977F. Electronic countermeasure systems were similar to those carried by the first Inhaúma-class ships.

== Ships of the class ==
Name	Hull number	Builder	Launched	Commissioned	Decommissioned	Status
Inhaúma	V30	Rio de Janeiro Navy Arsenal	13 December 1986	12 December 1989	25 November 2016	Sunk as target on 18 June 2019
Jaceguai	V31	Rio de Janeiro Navy Arsenal	8 June 1987	2 April 1991	18 September 2019	Sunk as target on 24 june 2021
Júlio de Noronha	V32	Rio de Janeiro Navy Arsenal	15 December 1989	7 October 1992	15 June 2026	Decommissioned; awaiting disposal
Frontin	V33	Rio de Janeiro Navy Arsenal	6 February 1992	11 March 1994	23 September 2015	Sunk as target on 12 April 2016
Barroso	V34	Rio de Janeiro Navy Arsenal	20 December 2002	19 August 2008		Active

== Construction and service ==
The first pair of Inhaúma-class ships were ordered for the Brazilian Navy on 15 February 1982 and the second pair on 9 January 1986. The number of ships in the class was initially intended to be 12, but this rose to 16 in 1986. The first two ships, Inhaúma and Jaceguai were constructed at the Rio de Janeiro Navy Arsenal. The contracts for the second pair, Júlio de Noronha and Frontin, were awarded to Verolme. However, while the second pair were under construction, the shipyard went bankrupt in 1991 and the incomplete hulls were taken to the Navy Arsenal for completion. The government of Brazil sought to find cheaper corvettes to construct and as a result, the number of ships in the class was cut to the four under construction.

Inhaúma was the first to enter service in 1989 and Frontin was the last, in 1994. In 1994, a second improved version of the class comprising six ships was ordered by the Brazilian government from the Navy Arsenal. However, that version too was scaled back due to funding issues and only one, Barroso entered service in 2008. In late 2008, the Inhaúma class underwent modernisation. Beginning in 2015, Inhaúma-class ships began to be taken out of service. Frontin was the first to be taken out of service in 2015. On 17 April 2016, ex-Fortin was sunk in the Atlantic Ocean between Rio de Janeiro and Vitória in a naval exercise involving several warships of the Brazilian Navy. An Excocet SSM from União was finished the ship. Inhaúma was taken out of service in 2016, followed by Jaceguai in 2019.
