= Vivacity 20 =

1960s English recreational keelboat

Development
- Designer: Peter Stevenson and Des C. Pollard
- Location: United Kingdom
- Year: 1963
- Builder: Russell Marine
- Role: Racer-Cruiser
- Name: Vivacity 20

Boat
- Displacement: 1,800 lb (816 kg)
- Draft: 2.33 ft (0.71 m)

Hull
- Type: monohull
- Construction: glassfibre
- LOA: 20.00 ft (6.10 m)
- LWL: 17.00 ft (5.18 m)
- Beam: 7.00 ft (2.13 m)
- Engine: outboard motor

Hull appendages
- Keel: twin keels
- Ballast: 680 lb (308 kg)
- Rudder: transom-mounted rudder

Rig
- Rig type: Bermuda rig
- I foretriangle height: 23.33 ft (7.11 m)
- J foretriangle base: 5.90 ft (1.80 m)
- P mainsail luff: 20.67 ft (6.30 m)
- E mainsail foot: 9.25 ft (2.82 m)

Sails
- Sailplan: masthead sloop
- Mainsail area: 95.60 sq ft (8.882 m^{2})
- Jib/genoa area: 68.82 sq ft (6.394 m^{2})
- Total sail area: 164.42 sq ft (15.275 m^{2})

Racing
- PHRF: 288

The Vivacity 20 is a recreational keelboat that was designed by Peter Stevenson and Des C. Pollard as a racer-cruiser and first built in 1963.

The design is a lengthened development of the Alacrity 19.

== Production ==
The design was built by Russell Marine in Essex, England, starting in 1963, but it is now out of production. The boat was produced complete and ready to sail or as a kit for amateur completion. It was also imported in the United States by Wells Yachts starting in the early 1960s.

== Design ==
The Vivacity 20 is built predominantly of glassfibre, with wood trim. It has a masthead sloop rig, a spooned raked stem, a reverse transom, a transom-hung rudder controlled by a tiller and twin keels or an optional single, fixed fin keel. It displaces 1,800 lb (816 kg) and carries 680 lb (308 kg) of iron ballast.

The boat has a draft of 2.33 ft (0.71 m) with the twin keels allowing operation in shallow water, beaching or ground transportation on a trailer.

The boat is normally fitted with a small 2 to 4 hp (1 to 3 kW) outboard motor for docking and manoeuvring.

The design has sleeping accommodation for four people, with a double "V"-berth in the bow cabin and two straight settee berths in the main cabin. The galley is located on the starboard side just aft of the bow cabin and is equipped with a sink. The head is located just aft of the bow cabin on the port side. Cabin headroom is 36 in (91 cm).

For sailing the design is equipped with a range of jibs or genoas.

The design has a PHRF racing average handicap of 288 and a hull speed of 5.6 kn (10.4 km/h).

== Operational history ==
In a 2010 review Steve Henkel wrote, "the Vivacity 20 was a popular early fiberglass micro-cruiser. Like her predecessor, the Alacrity 19 ... she features twin bilge keels and a low profile doghouse ... The boat was available as a kit, so there are numerous variations in finish and details ... It should also be noted that apart from six inches more on the waterline and 350 pounds more ballast, the Vivacity is thought by many to be almost indistinguishable from the Alacrity. Best features: About the best we can say for the Vivacity is that, like her near-sister Alacrity, she's a nice boat for her vintage, but her generally more up-to-date comp[etitor]s are better. Worst features: With her shallow twin keels—of iron, which rusts—each weighing a mere 240 pounds, she is probably less weatherly, more tender, and slower in light air ..."
