= Brazilian corvette Inhaúma =

Inhaúma-class corvettes

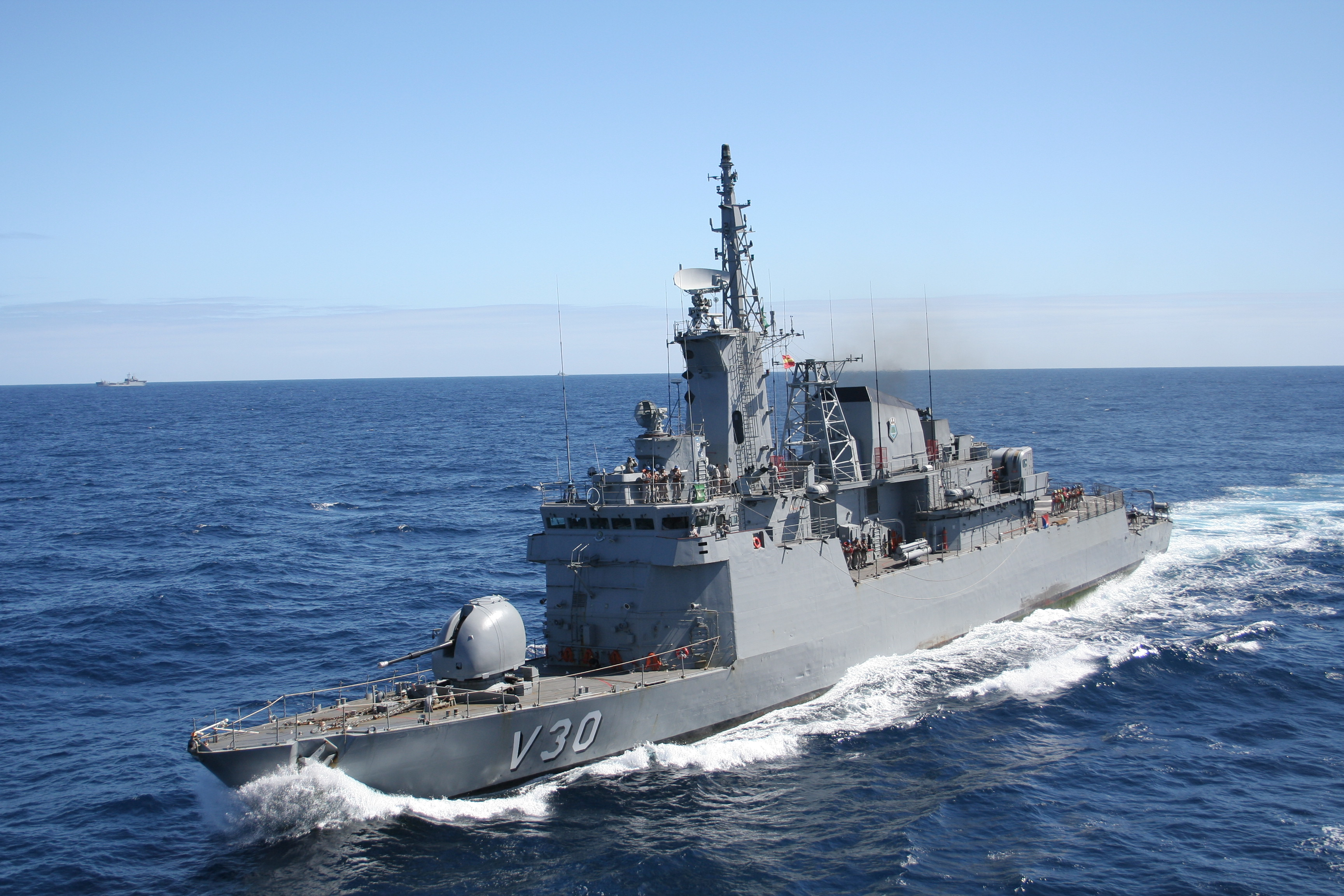
- Inhaúma

History

Brazil
- Name: Inhaúma
- Namesake: Inhaúma
- Builder: Arsenal de Marinha do Rio de Janeiro
- Launched: 13 December 1986
- Commissioned: 12 December 1989
- Decommissioned: 25 November 2016
- Refit: 2008
- Identification: Pennant number: V30
- Fate: Sunk as target, 2019

General characteristics
- Class & type: Inhaúma-class corvette
- Displacement: 1,700 t (1,670 long tons) standard; 2,000 t (1,970 long tons) full load
- Length: 95.8 m (314 ft 4 in)
- Beam: 11.4 m (37 ft 5 in)
- Draught: 5.5 m (18 ft 1 in)
- Propulsion: 2 shaft CODOG; 1 GE LM 2500 gas turbine - 20,500 kW (27,500 hp); 2 MTU 16 V 396 TB 91 diesel engines 5,600 kW (7,500 hp)
- Speed: 27 knots (50 km/h; 31 mph)
- Range: 4,000 nmi (7,400 km; 4,600 mi) at 15 knots (28 km/h; 17 mph)
- Complement: 145
- Sensors & processing systems: Plessey AWS-4 radar; Krupp Atlas ASO4 Mod 2 sonar
- Armament: 1 × 114 mm Mark 8 gun; 2 × Bofors 40 mm guns; 4 × Exocet SSMs; 6 × Mark 46 torpedoes
- Aircraft carried: Westland Super Lynx Mk.21B helicopter
- Aviation facilities: Helicopter pad

Inhaúma (V30) was the lead ship of the Inhaúma-class corvette of the Brazilian Navy.

== Construction and career ==
The ship was built at Naval Arsenal Rio de Janeiro in Rio de Janeiro and was launched on 13 December 1986 and commissioned on 12 December 1989.

She was decommissioned on 25 November 2016.

On June 18, 2019, Inhaúma was sunk as target during a Brazilian Navy missile test exercise, having been hit by an AGM-119 Penguin anti-ship missile launched from an SH-helicopter. 16 Seahawk, as well as other bombs used against it during this exercise.
