= Alacrity 19 =

18-foot British keelboat

Development
- Designer: Peter Stevenson
- Location: United Kingdom
- Year: 1960
- No. built: more than 700
- Builders: Hurley Marine; Russell Marine
- Name: Alacrity 19

Boat
- Displacement: 1,500 lb (680 kg)
- Draft: 1.82 ft (0.55 m)

Hull
- Type: monohull
- Construction: fibreglass
- LOA: 18.50 ft (5.64 m)
- LWL: 17.00 ft (5.18 m)
- Beam: 6.92 ft (2.11 m)
- Engine: 3 to 5 hp (2 to 4 kW) Outboard motor

Hull appendages
- Keel: twin fin keels
- Ballast: 480 lb (218 kg)
- Rudder: transom-mounted rudder

Rig
- Rig type: Bermuda rig
- I foretriangle height: 23.00 ft (7.01 m)
- J foretriangle base: 6.20 ft (1.89 m)
- P mainsail luff: 20.00 ft (6.10 m)
- E mainsail foot: 8.70 ft (2.65 m)

Sails
- Sailplan: masthead sloop
- Mainsail area: 87.00 sq ft (8.083 m^{2})
- Jib/genoa area: 71.30 sq ft (6.624 m^{2})
- Total sail area: 158.30 sq ft (14.707 m^{2})

Racing
- PHRF: 378

The Alacrity 19 is a British keelboat that was designed by Peter Stevenson as a cruiser and first built in 1960.

The Alacrity 19 is a fibreglass development of the wooden Alacrity 18. The design was developed into the Vivacity 20 in 1963.

== Production ==
The design was built by Hurley Marine and later Russell Marine in the United Kingdom, with more than 700 built, but it is now out of production. The boat was also imported into the United States by Wells Yachts.

== Design ==
The Alacrity 19 is a recreational keelboat, initially built of wood and later of fibreglass, with wood trim. It has a masthead sloop rig, a raked stem, a reverse transom, a transom-hung rudder controlled by a tiller and a fixed dual fin keels. It displaces 1,500 lb (680 kg) and carries 480 lb (218 kg) of iron ballast.

The boat has a draft of 1.82 ft (0.55 m) with the standard keels. It is normally fitted with a small 3 to 5 hp (2 to 4 kW) outboard motor for docking and manoeuvring.

The design has sleeping accommodation for three people, with a single berth on the port side of the bow and two straight settees in the main cabin. The galley is located on the starboard side opposite the bow berth. The head is located under a hanging locker just aft of the bow cabin on the port side.

The design has a PHRF racing average handicap of 378.

== Reception ==
In a 2010 review, American Steve Henkel compared the boat to the Windrose 18 and the Hunter 18.5. He wrote that hull design "indicates a nice shape for fast sailing, except for her pair of stubby keels ... the relatively large wetted surface of which would deter from good performance ... Best features: About the best we can say is that the Alacrity is a nice boat for her vintage ... Worst features: Her two comp[petitor]s, with their shallower board-up drafts, would be easier to launch and retrieve at a ramp. With her shallow twin keels of iron, which rusts, each weighing a mere 240 pounds, she is probably least weatherly, most tender, and slowest in light air compared to her lighter comp[petitor]s with their deeper centerboards, beamier hulls, bigger sail areas, etc—all in all not the boat to seek if performance is at all important to you."
