= Surprise-class cruiser =

Class overview
- Name: Surprise class
- Builders: Palmers Shipbuilding and Iron Company, Jarrow
- Operators: Royal Navy
- Built: 1884–1885
- In commission: 1885–1919
- Completed: 2
- Retired: 2

General characteristics
- Displacement: 1,700 long tons (1,727 t)
- Length: 250 ft (76 m) o/a
- Beam: 32 ft 6 in (9.91 m)
- Draught: 13 ft (4.0 m)
- Propulsion: 2 × 2-cylinder Palmers compound steam engines; 2,000 ihp (1,491 kW); 2 shafts
- Speed: 18 knots (33 km/h; 21 mph)
- Complement: 93
- Armament: 4 × 5 in (130 mm) Breech Loading guns; 4 × QF 6-pounder Hotchkiss guns; 2 × machine guns

The Surprise class were two 3rd class cruisers built for the British Royal Navy, and launched in 1885.

== Class history ==
Originally designed as unarmed dispatch ships, they were redesignated as fleet scouts while under construction and fitted with four 5-inch guns, four quick-firing 6-pounders, (Note: "6 pounder" refers to approximate weight of projectiles 6 pounds (2.7 kg), which was a traditional British way of denoting small guns.) and two machine guns. Built by Palmers at Jarrow, they displaced 1,700 tons, were 250 feet long, 36 feet 6 inches in the beam, and had a draught of 13 feet. Powered by two 2-cylinder compound steam engines they were capable of 18 knots, and had a crew of 93.

== Ships ==
=== HMS Surprise ===
The ship was laid down on 14 February 1884, launched on 17 January 1885, and completed in June 1885. After her sister ship was sold in 1913, she was renamed Alacrity, and served during World War I. Sold in 1919.

=== HMS Alacrity ===
The ship was laid down on 14 February 1884, launched on 28 February 1885, and completed in July 1885. She saw action during the Boxer Rebellion, taking part in the capture of the Dagu Forts in June 1900. Sold at Hong Kong in September 1913.
