= Brazilian submarine Tamoio =

Tupi-class submarines

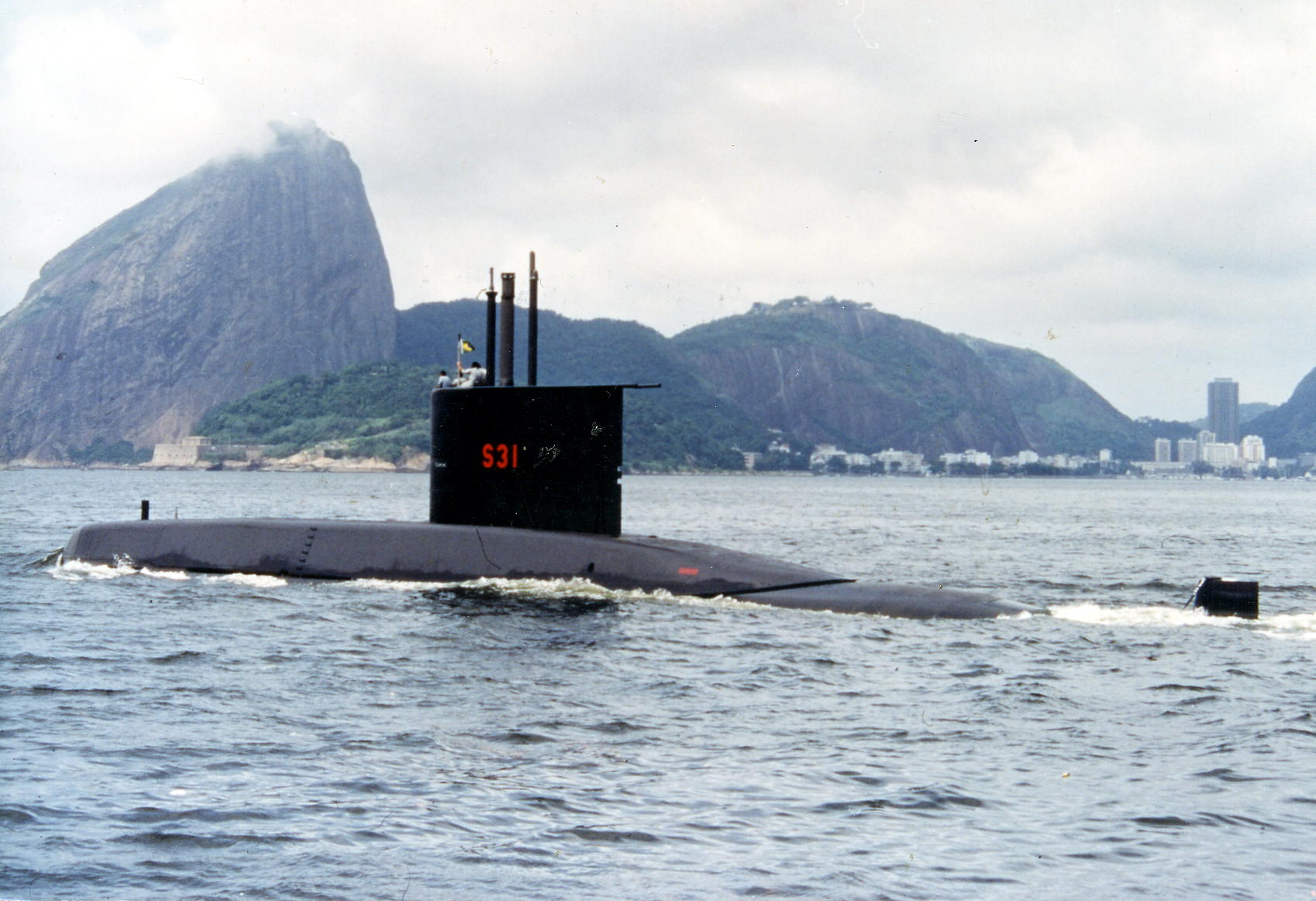
- S Tamoio

History

Brazil
- Name: Tamoio
- Namesake: Tamoio
- Builder: Arsenal de Marinha do Rio de Janeiro
- Laid down: 15 July 1986
- Launched: 18 November 1993
- Commissioned: 17 July 1995
- Decommissioned: 14 September 2023
- Identification: Pennant number: S-31
- Status: Decommissioned

General characteristics
- Class & type: Tupi-class submarine
- Displacement: 1,170 t (1,150 long tons) surfaced; 1,460 t (1,440 long tons) submerged
- Length: 61.2 m (200 ft 9 in)
- Beam: 6.25 m (20 ft 6 in)
- Draft: 5.5 m (18 ft 1 in)
- Propulsion: 4 ×diesel-electric engines; 1 × shaft, 4,500 kW (6,100 shp)
- Speed: 11 kn (20 kilometres per hour; 13 miles per hour) surfaced; 22 kn (41 km/h; 25 mph) submerged
- Range: 11,000 nmi (20,000 km; 13,000 mi) at 19 km/h (10 kn) surfaced; 8,000 nmi (15,000 km; 9,200 mi) at 19 km/h (10 kn) snorkeling; 400 nmi (740 km; 460 mi) at 7 km/h (4 kn) submerged
- Endurance: 50 days
- Test depth: 500 m (1,600 ft)
- Complement: 30
- Armament: 8 × 21 in (533 mm) torpedo tubes, 14 × torpedoes; optional UGM-84 Harpoon integration

Tamoio (S31) was the second Tupi-class submarine of the Brazilian Navy.

== Construction and career ==
The boat was built at Arsenal de Marinha do Rio de Janeiro in Rio de Janeiro and was launched on 18 November 1993 and commissioned on 17 July 1995. She was decommissioned in 14 September 2023, having served the Brazilian Navy for 28 years.

== Gallery ==
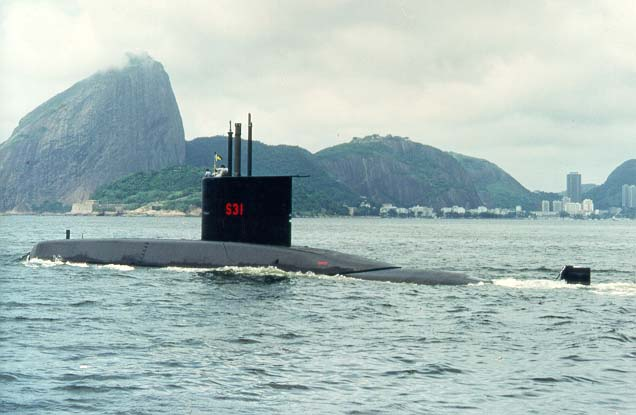
