= HMS Alacrity =

Nine ships of the Royal Navy have been named HMS Alacrity:

- HMS Alacrity (1806) was an 18-gun Cruizer-class brig-sloop launched in 1806 and captured by the French in 1811.
- HMS Alacrity (1818) was a 10-gun Cherokee-class brig-sloop launched in 1818 and sold in 1835.
- HMS Alacrity (1856) was a wooden screw sloop launched in 1856 and sold in 1864.
- HMS Alacrity (1872) was the former civilian vessel Ethel, purchased in 1872 and sold in 1882.
- HMS Alacrity (1885) was a Surprise-class third class cruiser, launched in 1885 and sold in 1913.
- the original Surprise-class third class cruiser HMS Surprise (1885) launched in 1885 was renamed HMS Alacrity in 1913 and sold in 1919.
- HMS Alacrity (1919) was a yacht and despatch vessel launched as Margarita in 1900, renamed Semiramis in 1910 and Mlada in 1913. She was requisitioned in 1918 and commissioned in 1919 as HMS Alacrity. She was paid off in 1922, sold in 1923 and broken up in 1936.
- HMS Alacrity (U60) was a Modified Black Swan-class sloop launched in 1944 and broken up in 1956.
- HMS Alacrity (F174) was a Type 21 frigate launched in 1974. She served in the Falklands War and was sold to Pakistan in 1994 and renamed Badr.

== Battle honours ==
Ships named Alacrity have earned the following battle honours:

- China, 1900
- Korea, 1950−52
- Falkland Islands, 1982
