= USS Alacrity =

Three ships of the United States Navy have been named Alacrity.

- USS Alacrity (SP-206)
- USS Alacrity (PG-87)
- USS Alacrity (MSO-520)
