= SS Alacrity =

Never-commissioned Royal Australian Navy vessel

Coordinates: 32°08′24″S 115°45′50″E

History

France
- Name: Jean Bart
- Namesake: Jean Bart
- Owner: Dunkirk Chamber of Commerce (1893–1902)
- Builder: Forges et Chantiers de la Méditerranée, Le Havre
- Launched: 4 March 1893
- Fate: Sold 1902

Australia
- Name: Alacrity (1902–1929)
- Owner: Howard Smith (1902–1917); Royal Australian Navy (1917–1925)
- Acquired: 1902 by purchase
- Fate: Wrecked 1931

General characteristics
- Tonnage: 353 GRT
- Length: 44.3 m (145 ft 6 in)
- Beam: 8.2 m (27 ft)
- Depth: 4.3 m (14 ft 3 in)
- Propulsion: Twin screw

SS Alacrity was a tug launched as Jean Bart at the shipyards of Forges et Chantiers de la Méditerranée in Le Havre, France on 4 March 1893 for the Dunkirk Chamber of Commerce. She was sold in 1902 to Howard Smith and renamed Alacrity for tug service in Port Phillip, Australia. In 1917, during World War I, she was purchased by the Royal Australian Navy for use as a patrol vessel, inspection vessel, and minesweeper based at Fremantle in Western Australia. She was never commissioned. After being sold in 1925, she was slated for breaking up and was moored in Jervoise Bay, until a fierce gale in Cockburn Sound wrecked her in 1931.
