= Rio de Janeiro Navy Arsenal =

Brazilian naval base

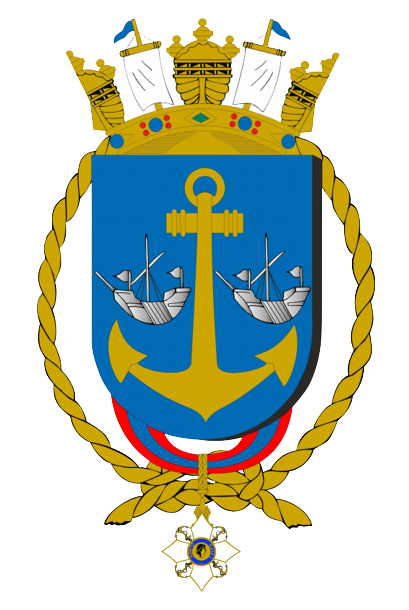
Rio de Janeiro Navy Arsenal
- Arsenal de Marinha do Rio de Janeiro
- Ilha das Cobras, Rio de Janeiro in Brazil
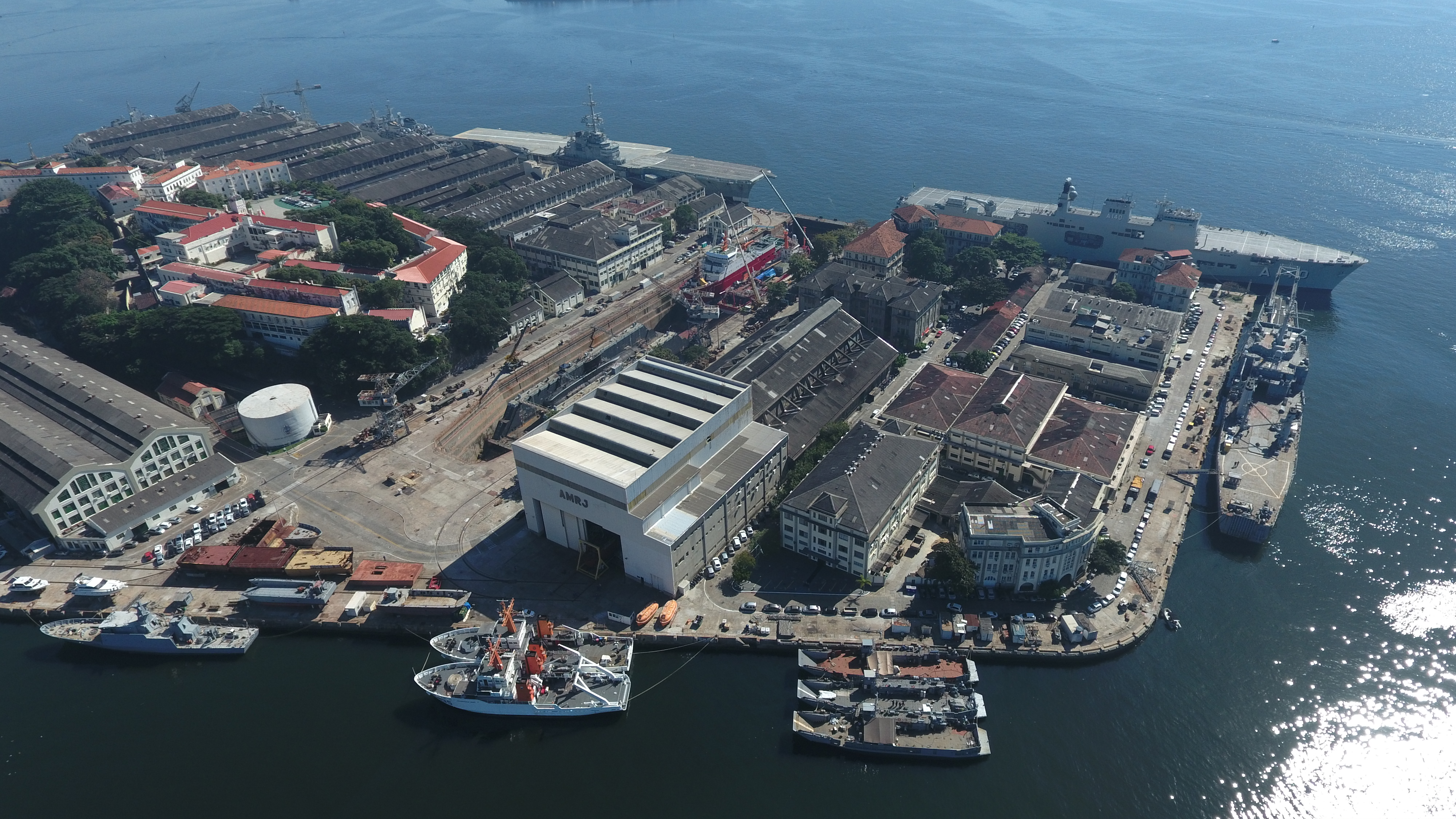

Site information
- Type: Navy base
- Controlled by: Brazilian Navy
- Open to the public: No

Location
- Location in Brazil
- Coordinates: 22°53′47″S 43°10′27″W

Site history
- In use: 1763-present

Garrison information
- Current commander: Contra-Almirante José Luiz Rangel da Silva

The Rio de Janeiro Navy Arsenal (Portuguese: Arsenal de Marinha do Rio de Janeiro; AMRJ) is a military organization of the Brazilian Navy. It is located in Ilha das Cobras, at the Guanabara Bay, in the city of Rio de Janeiro. The Arsenal is the main maintenance center and naval base of the Brazilian Navy, involving the design, construction and maintenance of ships and submarines, not only for the Brazilian Navy, but also friendly nations.

The AMRJ provides shipbuilding services both for military strategic reasons (mastery of technologies, seeking the reduction of external dependence), as economic ones, seeking nationalisation of components and the encouragement of domestic industry.

== History ==
The institution dates back to the installation of the Arsenal of Rio de Janeiro, at the foot of the hill of St. Benedict. Created on 29 December 1763, by the governor-general of Brazil António Álvares da Cunha, 1st Count da Cunha, with the purpose of repairing ships of the Portuguese Navy. At the time, the capital of the colony was being transferred from Salvador to Rio de Janeiro, among other reasons, for a better protection of the gold that came from Minas Gerais by the Royal Road.

With the arrival of the Portuguese Royal Family in 1808, the Arsenal started to be designated as Arsenal Real da Marinha or simply as Arsenal da Corte. In 1820, its dependencies began to expand to the Ilha das Cobras. After the independence of Brazil, faced with the need to organize and operate a Navy, the activities of the Arsenal became a priority. At this stage, it started to be called as Arsenal Imperial da Marinha, better known as Arsenal de Marinha da Corte.

The nineteenth century watched the transition from sailing to steam navigation. During the so-called Mauá era, vessels were built in the shipyard in Ponta d'Areia, in Niterói. Later, with the outbreak of the Paraguayan War, vessels for the Imperial Brazilian Navy were built in shipyards in England and in the AMRJ. At the end of the conflict, Brazil had the most powerful navy in the South Atlantic. In 1938 two Arsenals coexisted: the Arsenal de Marinha das Ilha das Cobras (AMIC) and the Arsenal de Marinha do Rio de Janeiro (AMRJ).

After 1948, only the Arsenal located in Ilha das Cobras survived, assuming the designation of Arsenal de Marinha do Rio de Janeiro.

== Projects ==
Projects include:

- Construction of the Piratini-class patrol boats
- Construction of the Pedro Teixeira-class river patrol vessels
- Construction of the Niterói-class frigates: Independência, União and Brasil
- Construction of the Inhaúma-Class corvettes: Inhaúma and Jaceguai;
- Construction of the Grajaú-class patrol boats: Grajaú and Guaíba
- Construction of the Tupi-class submarines: Tamoio, Timbira, Tapajó and Tikuna
- Completion of construction of the Macaé-class patrol vessels: Maracanã and Mangaratiba
- Construction of the Macaé-class patrol vessels: Miramar
- Large repairs to the Argentine submarine ARA Santa Cruz, including cutting the hull.

== See also ==
- List of ships of the Brazilian Navy
