= Alacrity (1813 ship) =

History

United Kingdom
- Name: Alacrity
- Owner: 31 July 1813: Thomas, Thomas Jnr & William Smith, Newcastle; 1814:Grainger & Co.; 18 August 1829:Enoch Donkerly Thompson & James Tate, South Shields and John Dickinson, Newcastle
- Builder: William Smith & Co at St Peter's Yard, Newcastle-on-Tyne
- Launched: 31 July 1813
- Fate: Wrecked January 1830

General characteristics
- Tons burthen: 268. or 269, or 26914/94, or 280, or 286 (bm)
- Length: 94 ft 2 in (28.7 m)
- Beam: 26 ft 0 in (7.9 m)
- Sail plan: Brigantine, later barque
- Armament: 6 × 9-pounder carronades

Alacrity was launched at Newcastle-on-Tyne in 1814. New owners transferred her registry to London and she then spent much of her career sailing between Britain and the Cape of Good Hope (CGH, or the Cape), sometimes going on to India. She made at least one voyage to New South Wales. One voyage resulted in a lawsuit, that her owners lost, for delayed arrival with a cargo. New owners in 1829 returned her registry to Newcastle. She was wrecked in 1830.

== Career ==
Alacrity first appeared in Lloyd's Register (LR) in 1813, but with no information on her master or owner. She was registered at London on 4 July 1814. Lloyd's Register for 1815 listed her master as Finlay, her owner as Granger, and her trade London–CGH.

Lloyd's Register and the Register of Shipping (RS) were only as accurate as shipowners chose to keep them. In the case of Alacrity both registers gave her trade as London–the Cape, with neither updating the information to include voyages to India.

The British East India Company in 1813 (EIC) lost its monopoly on trade between Britain and India. Still, vessels sailing east of the Cape were supposed to acquire a license from the EIC. Alacrity did not appear in LR's lists of licensed vessels.

On 3 November 1820 Alacrity, Findlay, master, left Deal for the Cape of Good Hope. She was at Algoa Bay on 16 May 1821 and the Cape on 18 June. She then proceeded to sail back and forth between the Cape and Mauritius. On 21 February 1822 she sailed to Sumatra, and returned to Mauritius 21 July. From Mauritius she sailed to the Cape, and from the Cape to Mauritius. On 31 March 1823 she arrived at the Cape in a much damaged state; she had encountered a hurricane six hours after leaving Mauritius. She then sailed back and forth between the Cape and Mauritius. On 7 October 1823 she left the Cape for London. She arrived at Cowes on 16 December, and 23 December sailed for Rotterdam.

On 29 June 1825 Alacrity, Findlay, master, left Deal, bound for the Cape and Bombay. She had to put back the next day having sustained damage. Similarly, Henry Wellesley, bound for Sierra Leone, put back having lost her mainmast. It is possible that the two vessels had run foul of each other. On 3 October Alacrity, Findlay, master, arrived at the Cape, and on 20 December she arrived at Bombay. On 9 July 1826 Alacrity arrived back at Deal, having left Bombay on 18 January, Tellichery on 13 February, the Cape on 1 May, and Saint Helena on 18 May. On 1 July she had encountered at 47°N 19°W an American vessel of about 200 tons, waterlogged and abandoned.

Year	Master	Owner	Trade	Source & notes
1815	J.Finlay	Grainger & Co.	London–CGH	LR
1820	J.Finlay	Grainger & Co.	London–CGH	LR
1825	J.Finlay	Finlay & Co.	Cowes–CGH	LR
1830	J.Finlay	R. Grainger	London–New South Wales	LR; good repair 1827

On 27 March 1827 Granger signed a contract with Dent that Alacrity would leave England by 27 April and that so long as she arrived at the Malabar Coast ready to load before 27 November, unless delayed by weather or other unavoidable impediment. Dent undertook to provide a cargo of 300 tons of pepper when she arrived.

Captain Findlay and Alacrity left the London docks on 22 April, bound for New South Wales. Unfavorable winds delayed her and she left Gravesend on 29 April, under tow by two steam tow boats. She was at Rio de Janeiro on 5 July, replenishing her water, some having been lost to leakage. She arrived at Simon's Bay on 7 August to effect repairs to her rudder, which storms had damaged. She sailed from Simon's Bay on 24 August. She arrived in Sydney in early October, where she unloaded her cargo. After a month in Sydney, n 10 November she sailed for Tellicherry, on the Malabar Coast. She arrived at Tellichery on 20 January 1828, at which time Dent refused a cargo on the grounds that she arrived too late. On Alacrity's return to England Granger sued Dent for the failure to deliver a cargo. On 19 December 1829 the jury found for Dent, the defendant, on the grounds that at several points on the voyage Findlay could, by extra effort and expense, have sped up his voyage.

== Fate ==
Alacrity, Dunn, master, ran aground on 15 January 1830 on the Barber Sand in the North Sea. She was refloated, but found to be leaky and was consequently beached at Great Yarmouth. Her crew were rescued. Alacrity was on a voyage from London to Newcastle upon Tyne.
