= 4.5-inch Mark 8 naval gun =

British naval gun

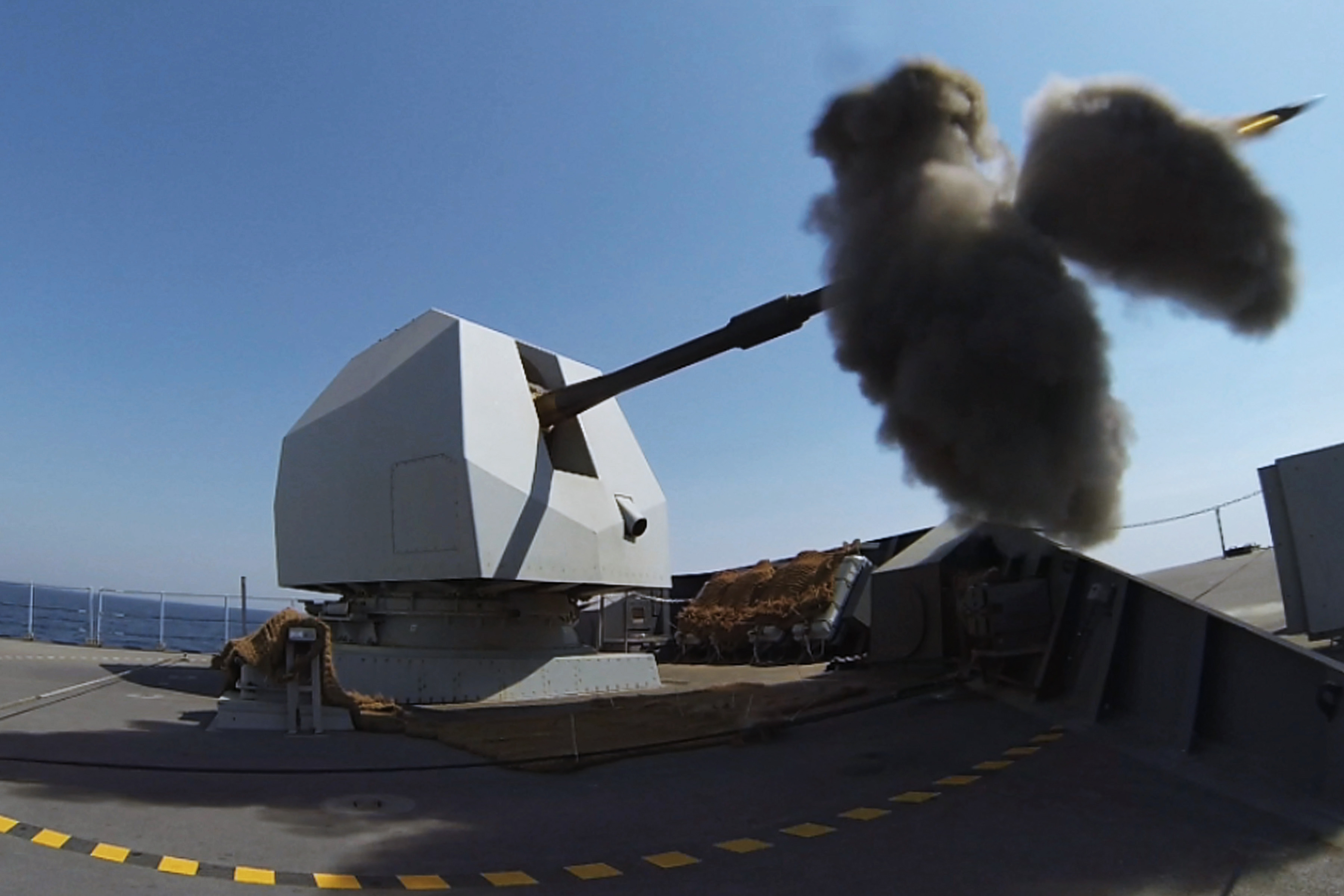
- 4.5-inch Mk 8 Mod 1 naval gun on HMS Defender. The multi-faceted gunhouse is designed to reduce radar cross section.
- Type: Naval gun
- Place of origin: United Kingdom

Service history
- In service: 1972–present
- Wars: Falklands War; Invasion of Iraq 2003; 2011 military intervention in Libya

Production history
- Designer: Mod 0 : Royal Armament Research and Development Establishment; Mod 1 : Royal Ordnance Defence
- Variants: Mod 0, Mod 1

Specifications
- Barrel length: 244.75 inches (6.217 m) bore (55 calibres)
- Shell: 113×700mmR; Fixed QF 46 pounds (21 kg) HE
- Calibre: 4.45-inch (113 mm)
- Rate of fire: 25 rounds per minute automatic
- Maximum firing range: 27.5 kilometres (17.1 mi)

The 4.5 inch Mark 8 is a British naval gun system which currently equips the Royal Navy's destroyers and frigates, and some British destroyers and frigates sold to other countries.

== Background ==
Guns with a 4.5 inch calibre have been the standard medium-calibre gun of the Royal Navy for use against surface, aircraft and shore targets since 1938. The current 55-calibre Mark 8 gun replaced the World War II era 45-calibre QF 4.5-inch Mk I – V naval guns. Like all British 4.5 inch naval guns, it has a calibre of 4.45 inches (113 mm).

== Design ==
A new type of 4.5 inch gun with a longer 55-calibre barrel, it was designed in the 1960s for the Royal Navy's new classes of frigates and destroyers. The weapon, built by Vickers Ltd Armament Division, was developed by the Royal Armament Research and Development Establishment using the Ordnance, QF 105 mm L13 of the Abbot self-propelled gun as a starting point (it used electrical primers). The outer shell of the gunhouse is built from glass-reinforced plastic (GRP).

The new weapon emphasised reliability and rapid response to fire first round from shutdown state (particularly for defence against missiles) over a high rate of fire, allowing a switch to a lighter, single barrel mounting and ammunition of a one-piece design.

The gun system has a combination of electrical and hydraulic components and the full system penetrates up to three deck levels below the weather deck; deep magazine, gun control room and power room, gunbay and the gunhouse.

The weapon is semi-automatic and can be operated by a smaller crew than its predecessors. With no personnel in the gunhouse, loading is supported by personnel in the gunbay to load the feed ring and in the deep magazine to pass ammunition to the gunbay. The captain of the gun in the control room ensures weapon readiness and the gun controller in the operations room aims and fires the weapon. The gun has a rate of fire of about 25 rounds per minute and a range of 12 nmi (14 mi; 22 km) with the newer High Explosive Extended Range round.

The first recipient of the new gun and mount, the Mark 8, was the Iranian frigate Zaal in 1971. The gun entered Royal Navy service in 1973 on the new destroyer Bristol.

These guns proved to be less reliable than the older 4.5 inch Mark V gun (renamed Mark 6 gun mounting) during the Falklands War, being forced to cease fire on several occasions due to faults.

The first major modification to the mounting, the Mod 1, was developed in 1998 in two tranches replacing the gunhouse with a reduced radar cross section assembly and replacing the hydraulic loading mechanism with an all-electric system. This particular gun has been nicknamed the "Kryten gun" by members of Royal Navy, after the odd shaped head of a robot from the British Sci-fi comedy series Red Dwarf. Babcock upgraded 13 guns to Mod 1 standard between 2005 and 2012.

The guns are capable of operating in a fire support role against land or sea targets but according to Navy Lookout, software for the system is insufficient to support anti-aircraft missions. However, according to Alex Walters of Forces.net, it may be possible to use the 4.5-inch Mark 8 as an air defence weapon.

== Ammunition ==
HE ER :

- Weight of complete round - 80.5 lbs. (36.5 kg)
- Length of complete round - 48.7 in (123.8 cm)
- Projectile weight - 45.4 lbs. (20.6 kg)
- Bursting charge - 6.6 lbs. (3 kg) RDX/TNT (60/40)
- Propellant charge - 15.8 lbs. (7.15 kg)
- Muzzle velocity - 2,850 fps (869 m/s)
- Cartridge case - Brass, 114 x 700 mm R

HE N4A1 :

- Weight of complete round - 80.5 lbs. (36.5 kg)
- Length of complete round - 48.7 in (123.8 cm)
- Projectile weight - 46 lbs. (20.9 kg)
- Bursting charge - N/A
- Propellant charge - 15.8 lbs. (7.15 kg)
- Muzzle velocity - 2,850 fps (869 m/s)
- Cartridge case - Brass, 114 x 700 mm R

== 155 mm variant ==
The Ministry of Defence investigated a proposal from BAE Systems to adapt the 4.5 inch system to accept the heavier calibre 155 mm (6.1 inch) gun barrel and breech from the AS-90 self-propelled gun. This "155mm Third Generation Maritime Fire Support" (155 TMF) would introduce a common gun calibre for the British Army and Royal Navy, helping with ammunition logistics, and encouraging joint Army-Navy development of extended range and precision guided shells. A £4m contract was awarded to develop a prototype, and firing trials were scheduled for 2009 with delivery in 2014, but the project was cancelled in the cuts implemented following the 2010 Strategic Defence and Security Review.

== Operational history ==
The Mk 8 was used in the Falklands War for naval gunfire support. The Type 21 frigate HMS Alacrity used her Mk 8 to sink the Argentine transport ARA Isla de los Estados. In 2011, HMS Iron Duke used her Mk 8 gun to destroy a gun battery outside of the besieged town of Misrata, Libya, while Liverpool used her Mk 8 gun to destroy a shore battery that had fired missiles at her.

== Replacement ==
Although the Mk 8 was fitted to the Type 45 destroyer, on the Type 26 frigate it will be supplanted by the BAE 5-inch Mk 45 naval gun.

== Deployment ==
=== Current ===
- Royal Navy
  - Type 45 destroyer
  - Type 23 frigate
- Chilean Navy
  - Type 23 frigate
- Brazilian Navy
  - Niterói class
  - Inhaúma class
- Islamic Republic of Iran Navy
  - Alvand class
- Royal Thai Navy
  - HTMS Makut Rajakumarn

=== Historical ===
- Royal Navy
  - Type 22 (Batch 3) frigate
  - Type 21-class frigate
  - Type 42 destroyer
  - Type 82 destroyer
- Libyan Navy
  - Dat Assawari
- Pakistan Navy
  - Tariq-class destroyer
- Royal Malaysian Navy
  - KD Rahmat

== Gallery ==
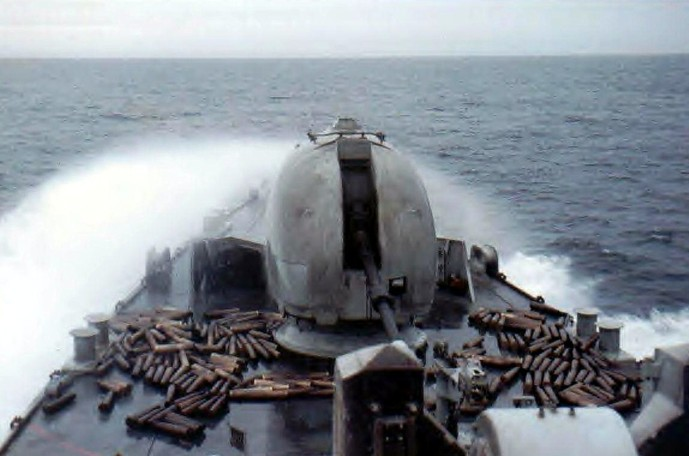
Spent shells from HMS Cardiff's Mod 0 gun during the Falklands War. The top of her worn Sea Dart launcher can also be seen in the bottom right corner.

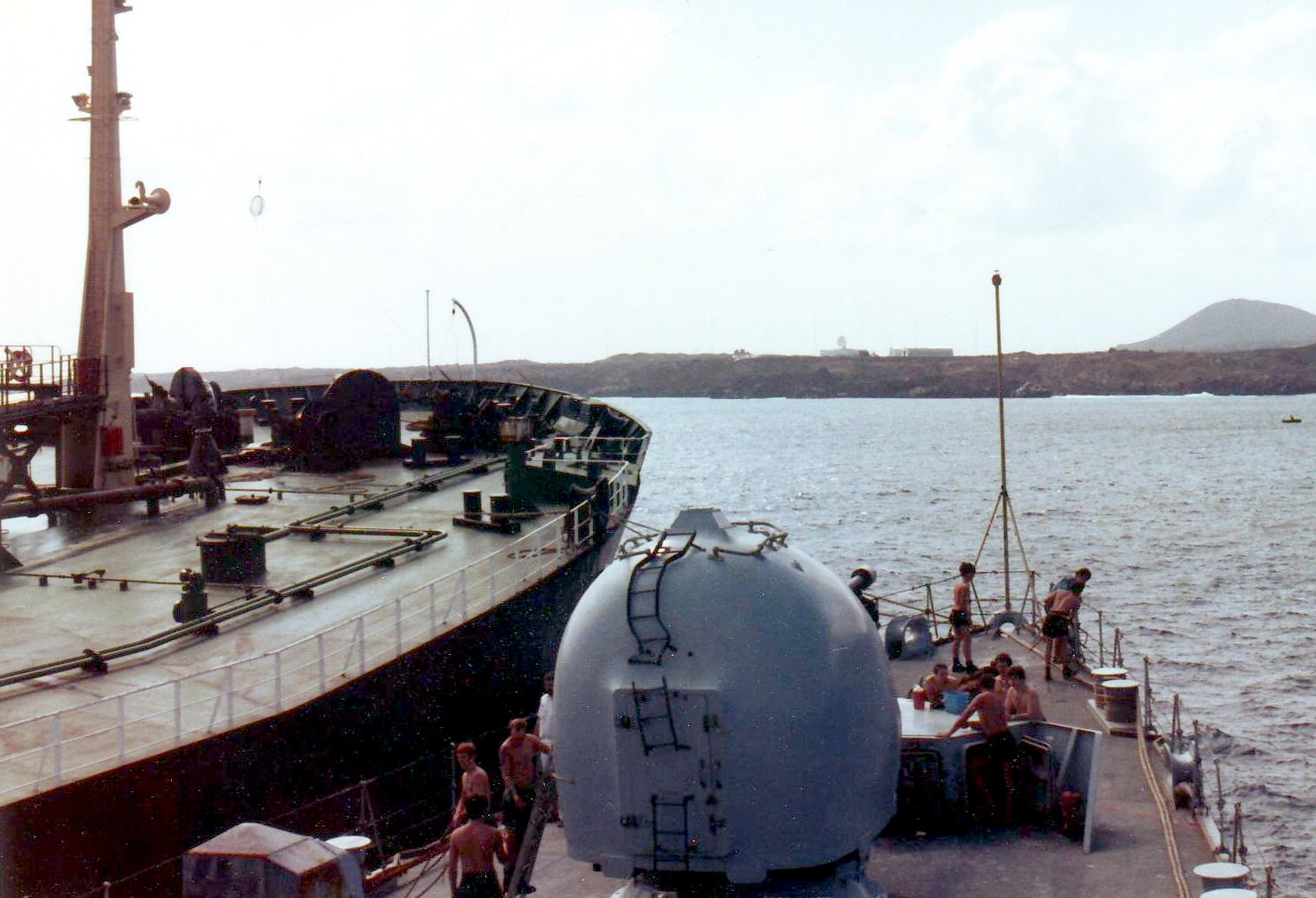
The ladder to Cardiff's Mod 0 gun can be seen here, damaged by a freak wave.

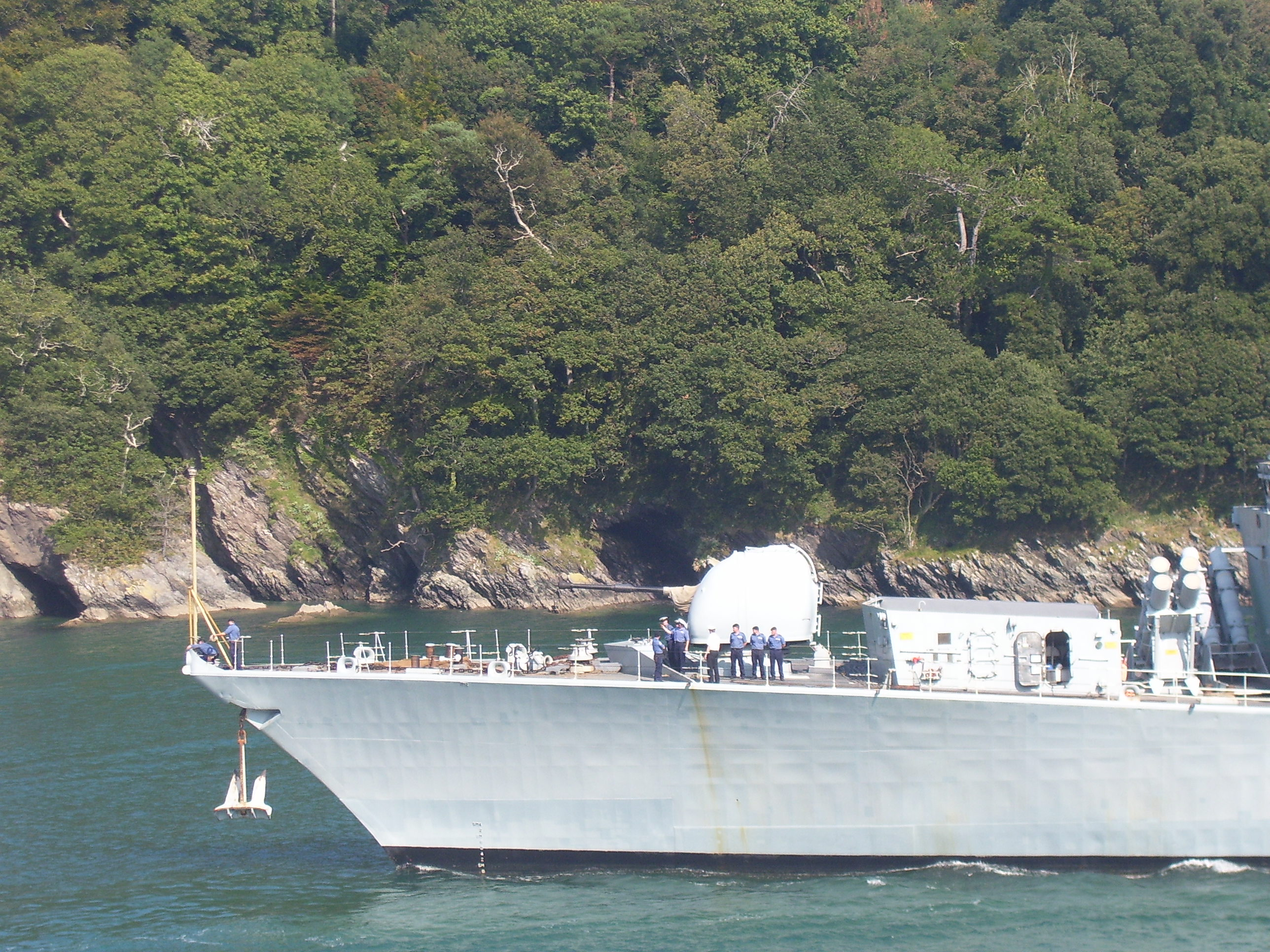
HMS Sutherland's Mod 0 gun

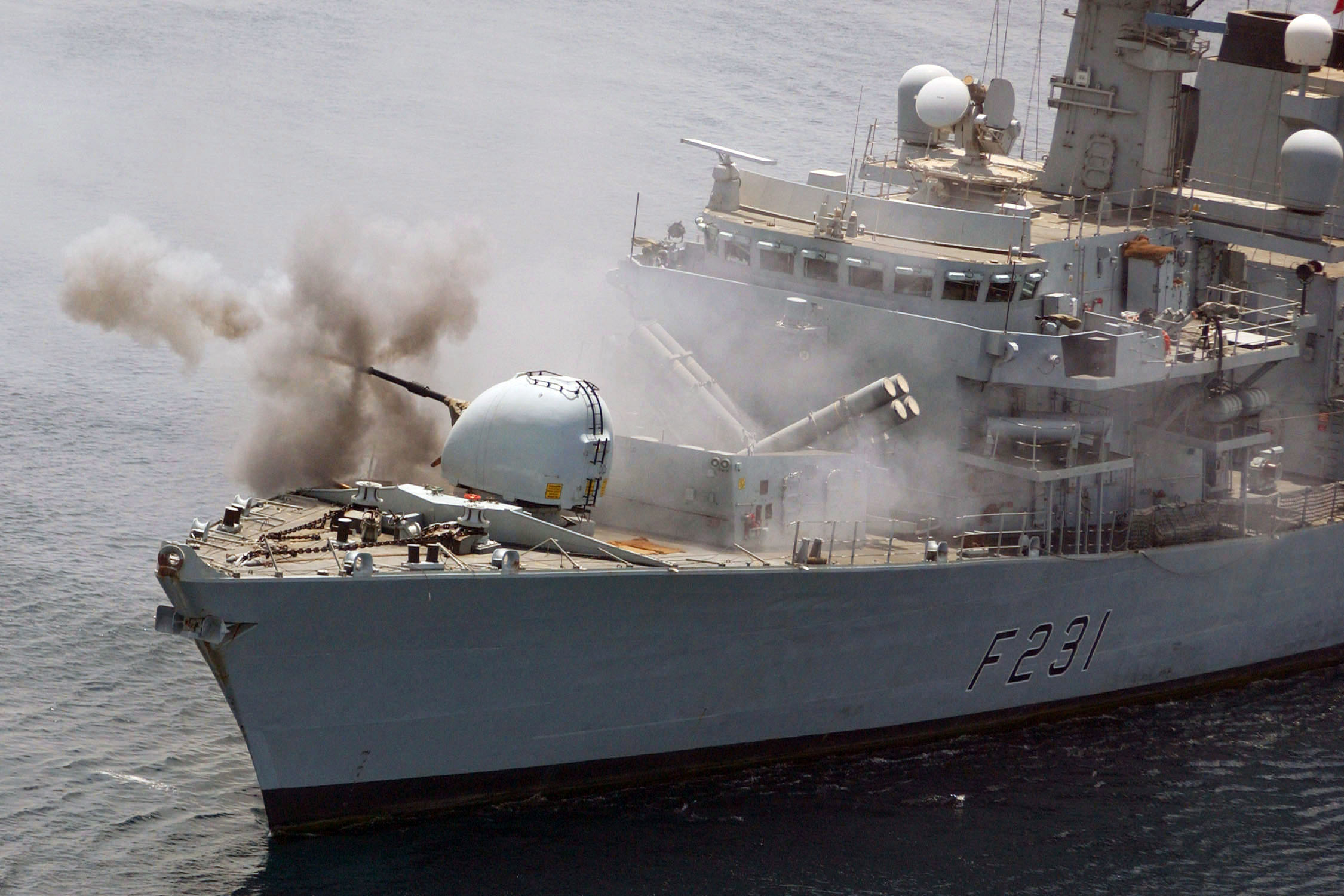
HMS Argyll firing during an exercise in the Middle East

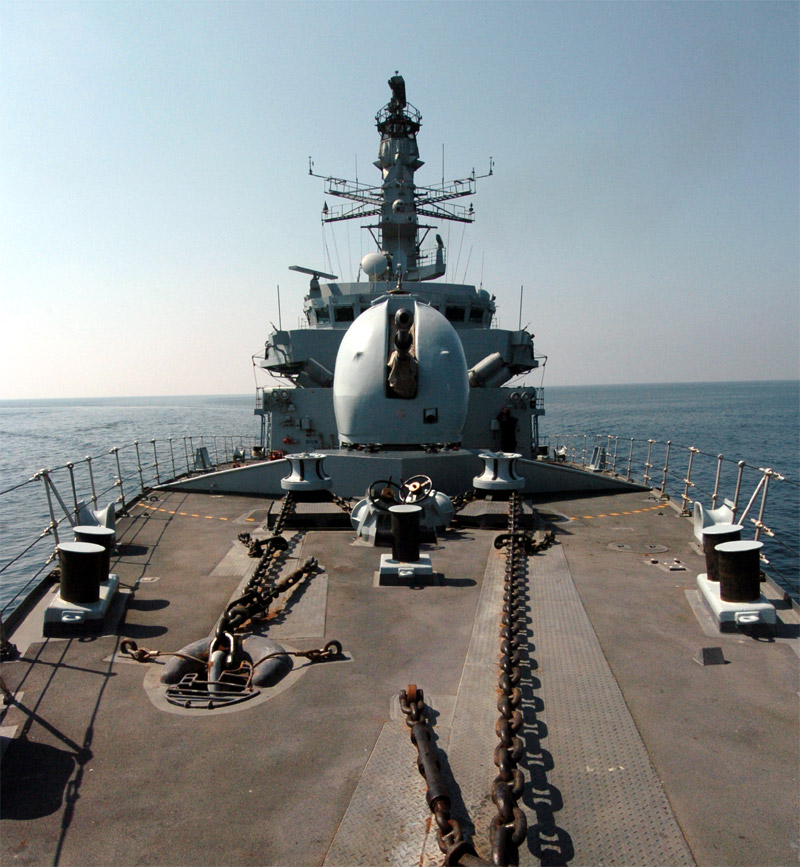
HMS Grafton's Mod 0 gun

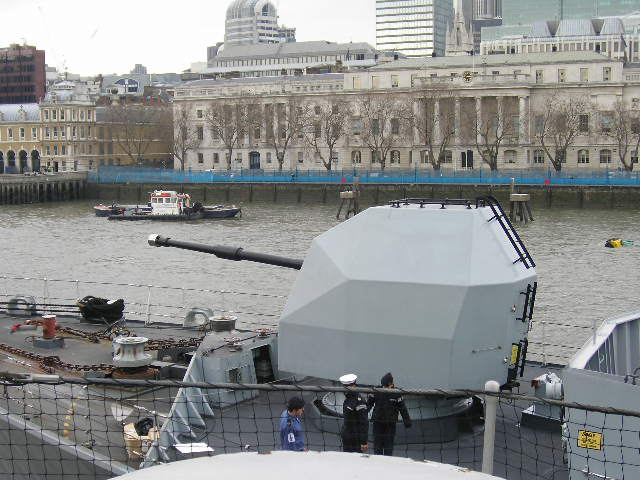
4.5-inch Mk 8 Mod 1 naval gun on HMS Northumberland.

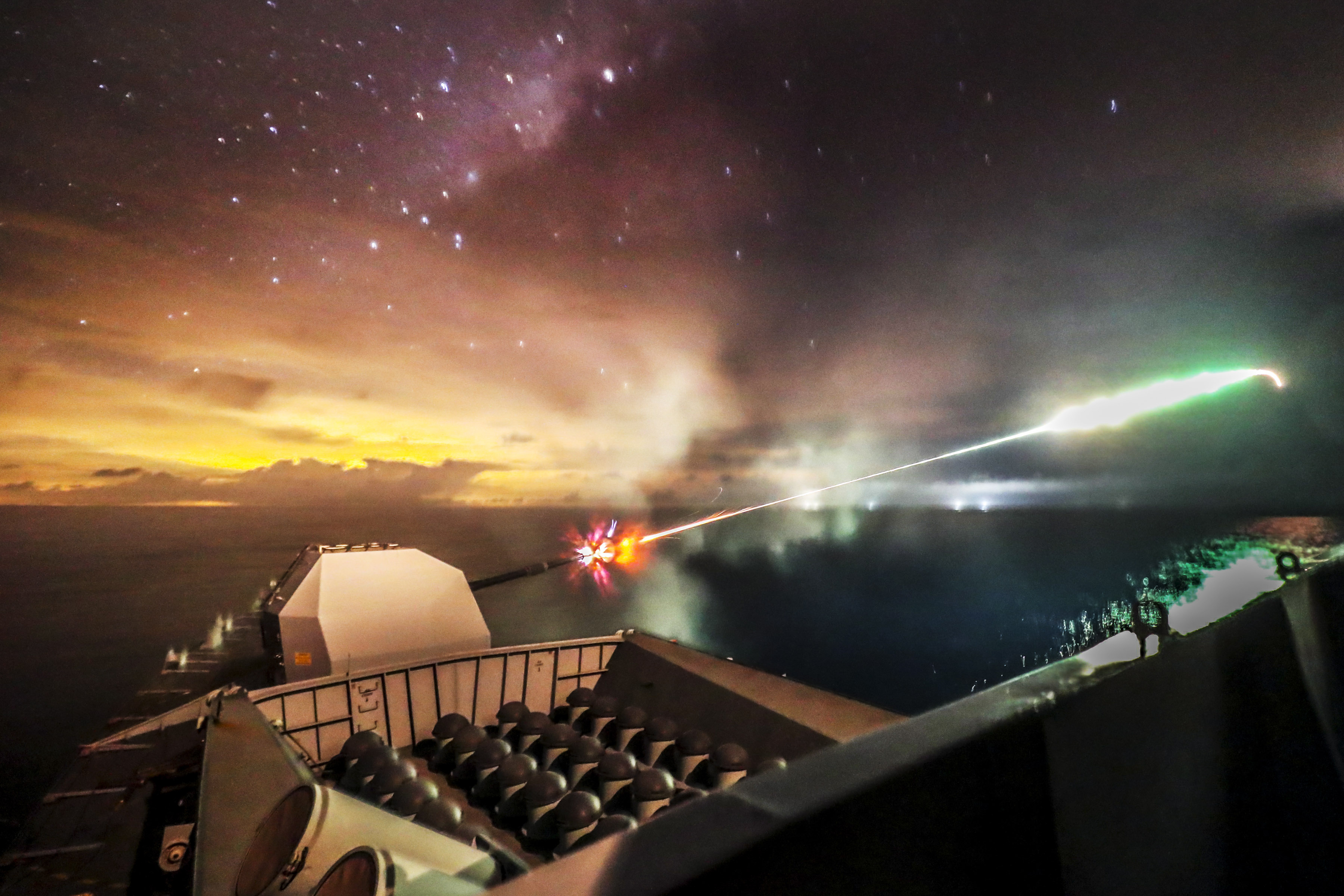
HMS Argyll firing her 4.5-inch Mark 8 naval gun during Exercise Bersama Lima.

== See also ==
- QF 4.5-inch Mk I – V naval gun – British predecessor
- Advanced Gun System – BAE's new 155 mm long-range gun system for the US Navy's Zumwalt class destroyers

=== Weapons of comparable role, performance and era ===
- 5"/54 caliber Mark 45 gun: contemporary standard naval gun for US ships
- AK-130: contemporary 130 mm twin standard naval gun mounting for Russian ships
- H/PJ-38 130mm naval gun : contemporary 130 mm standard naval gun mounting for Chinese ships
- French 100 mm naval gun: contemporary standard naval gun for French ships
- Otobreda 127/54 Compact and Otobreda 127/64: contemporary 127 mm naval gun from Italian manufacturer Oto Melara
