= Sabre (disambiguation) =

A sabre is a type of sword.

Sabre, Sabres, saber, or SABRE may also refer to:

== Weapons and weapon systems ==
- Sabre (fencing), a sporting sword
- Sabre (tank), a modern British armoured reconnaissance vehicle
- Chinese sabre or dao, a variety of Chinese sword
- HMS Sabre, three ships of the Royal Navy
- North American F-86 Sabre, an American jet fighter aircraft
  - North American F-100 Super Sabre, an American supersonic jet fighter aircraft
- SS-20 Saber, NATO designation for the RT-21M Pioneer missile

== Fiction ==
- Sabre (comics), one of the first graphic novels
- Sabre, a fictional electronics company from The Office
  - Sabre (The Office), an episode of The Office
- Sabre, the name of Vert Wheeler's car in Hot Wheels Battle Force 5
- Sabre, a vehicle in the Grand Theft Auto video game series
- Sabre (1997), a novel by James Follett

== Aircraft and rocket engines ==
- SABRE (rocket engine) (Synergistic Air-Breathing Rocket Engine), a proposed combined cycle rocket engine
- Arnet Pereyra Sabre II, an ultralight aircraft
- Canadair Sabre, a jet fighter aircraft
- Napier Sabre, a piston aeroengine
- North American Sabreliner, a mid-sized business jet

== Organisations and companies ==
- SaBRE (Supporting Britain's Reservists and Employers), a UK government campaign
- Sabre Automotive, a defunct British racing car constructor later known as Reynard Motorsport
- Sabre Corporation, an American travel technology company which runs an air travel reservations system by the same name
- SABRE Research UK, a UK charity for the scientific evaluation of animal models in medicine
- Society for All British and Irish Road Enthusiasts (SABRE), a website covering the British and Irish road network

== Sports teams ==
- Buffalo Sabres, NHL hockey team
- Somerset Sabres, the name used by Somerset County Cricket Club in one day competition
- Sheffield Sabres, an English basketball team, from Sheffield, South Yorkshire
- Sabre Motorsport, a New Zealand racing car constructor and team

== Other uses ==
- Sabre (travel reservation system), a system owned by Sabre Holdings, originally developed by American Airlines
- Sabre (dinghy), a class of sailing dinghy
- Sabre Peak, a mountain in New Zealand
- Sabres, Landes, a commune in the Landes department in France
- Honda Sabre, a Honda motorcycle
- SABRE Experiment, an improved version of the DAMA/LIBRA dark matter detection experiment
- Sabre squadron, an army combat unit of sub-battalion size

== See also ==
- Sabre Jet (disambiguation)
- Society for American Baseball Research (SABR)
- Saber (disambiguation)
- Ceiba (disambiguation)
- Saba (disambiguation)
- Sable (disambiguation)
