= Saber (disambiguation) =

A saber, or sabre, is a type of sword.

Saber may also refer to:

== People ==
- Saber (artist), (born 1976), American graffiti artist and painter

=== Given name ===
- Saber Abar (born 1984), Iranian actor and theater director
- Saber Azizi (born 1996), Afghan footballer
- Saber Bamatraf (born 1988), Yemeni musician and cultural activist
- Saber Boukemouche (born 1992), Algerian athlete
- Saber Chebana (born 1983), Algerian football player
- Saber Hossain Chowdhury (born 1961), Bangladeshi politician
- Saber Didehvar (born 1995), Iranian footballer
- Saber Abdel Aziz al-Douri (born 1949), Iraqi politician
- Saber Eid (1959–2025), Egyptian football player
- Saber Ben Frej (born 1979), Tunisian football player
- Saber Hardani (born 1996), Iranian footballer
- Saber Mohamed Hasan (born 1967), Bahraini cyclist
- Saber Hraiech (born 1995), Italian-Tunisian footballer
- Saber Hussain (born 1981), Saudi footballer
- Saber Hussein (born 1974), Egyptian handball player
- Saber Kazemi (1998–2025), Iranian volleyball player
- Saber Khalifa (born 1986), Tunisian football player
- Saber Mirghorbani (born 1983), Iranian football player
- Saber Mohammadzadeh (died 1988), Iranian politician
- Saber Nakdali (born 1960), Syrian wrestler
- Saber Rastikerdar (1986–2023), Iranian programmer
- Saber Rebaï (born 1967), Tunisian pan-Arab singer and composer
- Saber Safar (born 1967), a Free Syrian Army colonel and defector from the Syrian Army
- Saber Sangar (born 1953), Afghan political and military leader
- Saber Souid (born 1981), Tunisian athlete and hammer thrower

=== Surname ===
- Abdelilah Saber (born 1974), Moroccan football player
- Alber Saber (born 1985), Egyptian computer science student and blogger
- Ashraf Saber (born 1973), Italian athlete and runner of Egyptian descent
- Danny Saber (born 1966), American musician, audio engineer, record producer, and remixer
- Hoda Saber (1959–2011), Iranian scholar, journalist and activist
- Mahfouz Saber (1945–2023), Egyptian judge and politician
- Moinul Ahsan Saber (born 1958), Bangladeshi fiction writer
- Reza Olfati-Saber, Iranian American Aroboticist

=== Fictional characters ===
- Saber (Fate/stay night), a fictional character from the Japanese visual novel and anime series
- Mark Saber, fictional character from the series ABC Mystery Theater, The Vise, and Saber of London
- Kamen Rider Saber, the main character in Kamen Rider Saber

== Other uses ==
- Kamen Rider Saber, a 2020-21 Japanese tokusatsu series produced by Toei and TV Asahi
- Lightsaber, a fictional weapon, sometimes shortened to saber.
- Saber (software), a simulation program
- Saber Interactive, a video game developer
- Saber Radar, a project of the Brazilian Army
- Saber squadron, an army combat unit
- SS-20 Saber, NATO reporting name of Soviet missile RSD-10 Pioneer
- Saber (cruise missile), Emirati air-launched cruise missile
- Systems Approach for Better Education Results (SABER), a World Bank Group initiative
- S.A.B.E.R., a fictional organization in the Marvel Cinematic Universe

== See also ==
- Sabre (disambiguation)
- Sabir (disambiguation)
- Beit Saber, a village in southern Syria
- Sabero, a municipality in Castile and León, Spain
- Sabor, Croatian Parliament
- Sabur, a village in Iran
