= List of equipment of the Brazilian Marine Corps =

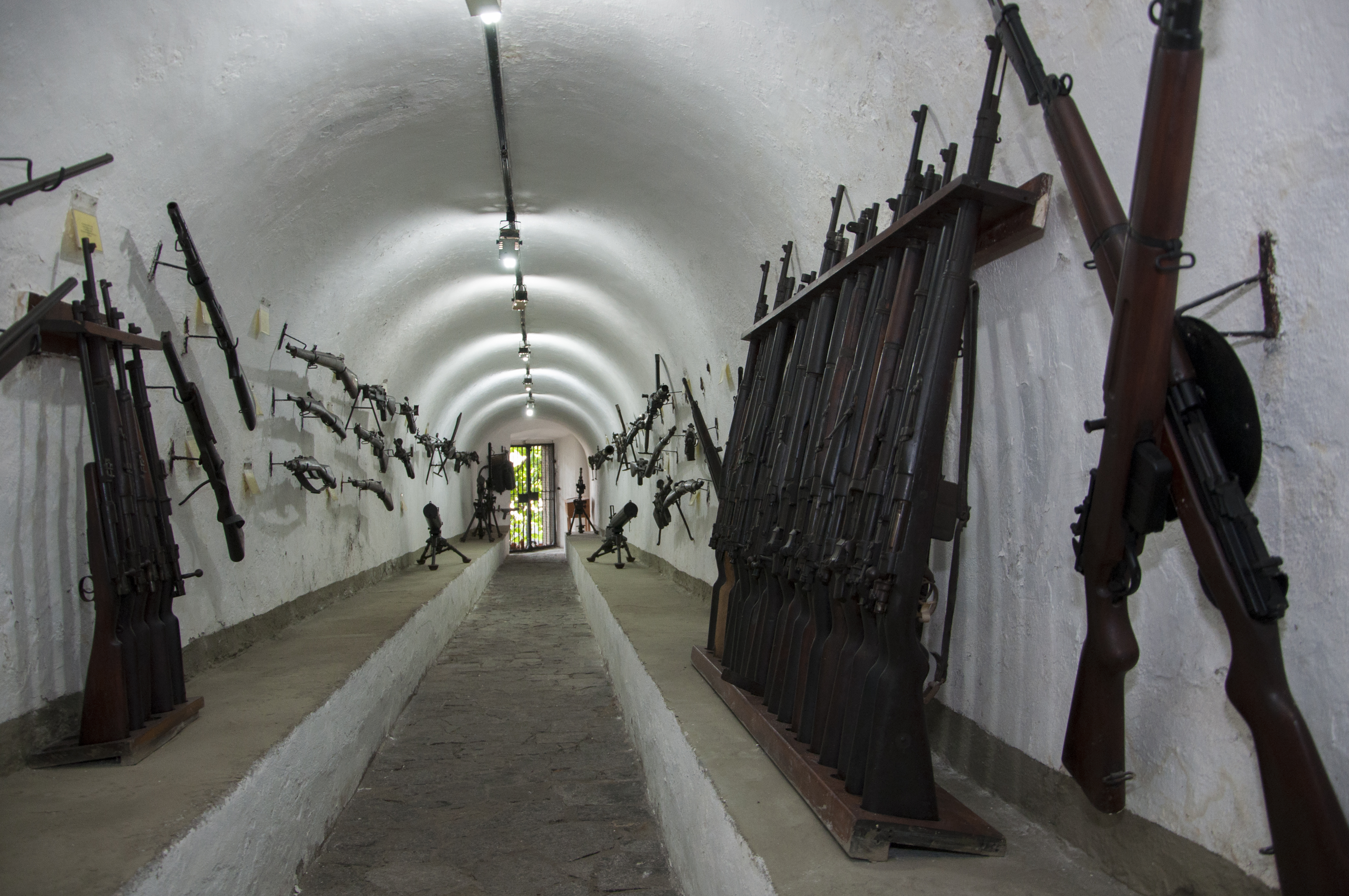
Historical rifles showcased at the Marine Corps Museum in Rio de Janeiro

This is a list of current and historical equipment of the Brazilian Navy's Corps of Naval Fusiliers (CFN), also known as the Brazilian Marine Corps.

== Light weapons ==
The CFN's firearms inventory as of 2010 was estimated at 4,300 pistols, 2,400 submachine guns, 17,600 automatic rifles, 1,600 medium machine guns and 300 heavy machine guns. Individual marines wear two camouflage patterns, the older lizard standard and, since 2021, a digital pattern for urban environments. The lizard pattern consists of a light green background with brown and dark green strokes. It is used by all three branches of the Armed Forces and can be distinguished in the Navy by its lighter tones compared to Army camouflage. Parade uniforms have a bold red color.

=== Pistols ===
Name	Origin	Caliber	Period	Image
Taurus PT92AF	Brazil	9×19mm	In use in 2014	
Taurus PT 24/7G2	Brazil	9×19mm	In use in 2014	

=== Submachine guns ===
Name	Origin	Caliber	Period	Image
Taurus MT-9A	Brazil	9×19mm	In use in 2014	
Heckler & Koch MP5SD	Germany	9×19mm	In use in 2014 by Amphibious Commandos	
Heckler & Koch MP5KA4	Germany	9×19mm	In use in 2014 by Amphibious Commandos	
IMI Mini-Uzi	Israel	9×19mm	In use in 2014 by Amphibious Commandos	

=== Rifles ===
Name	Origin	Caliber	Period	Image
Mauser 1908	Germany	7.65×53mm	In use in 1929	
SAFN-49	Belgium	7.62×63mm	1957 – 1978	
M1 Garand	United States	7.62×63 mm	In training use in the 1950s	
FN FAL	Brazil	7.62×51mm	In limited use in 2014	
Colt M16A2	United States	5.56×45mm	1997 – present (2014)	
Colt M4	United States	5.56×45mm	In use in 2014 by Amphibious Commandos	

=== Shotguns ===
Name	Origin	Caliber	Period	Image
Mossberg 590	United States	12 ga	In use in 2014	

=== Machine guns ===
Name	Origin	Caliber	Period	Image
Fuzil Automático Pesado	Brazil	7.62×51mm	In use in 2012	
FN MAG	Belgium	7.62×51mm	In use in 2014	
FN Minimi	Belgium	5.56×45mm	In use in 2014	
Browning M2HB	United States	12.7×99mm	In use in 2014	

=== Sniper rifles ===
Name	Origin	Caliber	Period	Image
Parker-Hale M85	United Kingdom	7.62×51mm	Under replacement by the PGM Ultima Ratio in 2014	
PGM Ultima Ratio	France	7.62×51mm	In use in 2014	

=== Anti-materiel rifles ===
Name	Origin	Caliber	Period	Image
PGM Hecate II	France	12.7×99mm	In use in 2014	

=== Grenade launchers ===
Name	Origin	Caliber	Period	Image
SB LAG 40	Spain	40mm	In use in 2010	
M203	United States	40mm	In use in 2012	
Mk 19	United States	40mm	In use in 2014	

=== Recoilless weapons ===
Name	Origin	Number	Caliber	Period	Image
M20 Super Bazooka	United States		89 mm	In use in 1997	
M40A1 gun	United States	8 (1997)	106 mm	In use in 1997	
AT-4	Sweden		84 mm	In use in 2012	

=== Anti-tank guided missiles ===
Name	Origin	Number	Period	Image
RBS 56 BILL	Sweden	18 (2012)	Possibly in use in 2021; (Note: Mentioned by Janes. Statistics provided by the Navy in 2019 listed this platform, but specified the number of platforms in service as zero.) phased out by 2025	
MAX 1.2 AC	Brazil		Delivered in 2025	

=== Light and medium mortars ===
Name	Origin	Number	Caliber	Period	Image
M60 Brandt	France	103 (2012) 67 (2019)	60 mm	In use in 2019	
M29A1	United States	26 (2012) 32 (2019); 18 (2024)	81 mm	In use in 2024	

== Armor ==
Armored fighting vehicles are present in the CFN since July 20 1973, when the Motorized Transport Battalion received five units of the EE-11 Urutu. Armored vehicles would be used in this battalion, renamed Amphibious Vehicles Battalion in 1985, and in the Tank Company, created in 1980 to employ the EE-9 Cascavel. The latter was disbanded in 2003 and its assets joined with a company of the Amphibious Vehicles Battalion to form the Marine Armor Battalion. Most of the CFN's armor is organized within this battalion. The Amphibious Vehicles Battalion operates the Assault Amphibious Vehicle, locally known as the Carro sobre Lagarta Anfíbio (CLAnf). By the International Institute for Strategic Studies's (IISS) estimate, as of 2024 the CFN operated 18 light tanks, 60 armored personnel carriers, 47 amphibious armored vehicles and two armored engineering vehicles.

=== Light tanks ===
Name	Origin	Number	Period	Image
SK-105 Kürassier	Austria	17 A2S and 1 4KH7FA (recovery vehicle) (2001) 10 (2019)	2001 – present (2024)	

=== Armored cars ===
Name	Origin	Number	Period	Image
EE-9 Cascavel	Brazil	6	1980 – 1998	

=== Personnel carriers ===
Name	Origin	Number	Period	Image
EE-11 Urutu	Brazil	5	1973 – earlier than 1986	
M113	United States	30 (24 M113A1 transports, 2 M125 A1 mortar carriers, 2 M571 A1 command posts, 1 XM806E1 recovery vehicle and 1 M113 A1G repair team carrier) (1974) 66% in operation (2010)	1974 – present (2024)	
Carro sobre Lagarta Anfíbio (Assault Amphibious Vehicle 7A1)	United States	11 (1997) 26 (2012); 49 (13 AAV-7A1, 20 AAVP-7A1 RAM/RS, 2 AAVC-7A1 RAM/RS, 12 LVTP-7, 1 AAVR-7, 1 AAVR-7A1 RAM/RS) (2024)	1986 – present (2024)	
Mowag Piranha IIIC	Switzerland	30 (2024)	2007 – present (2024)	
Oshkosh L-ATV	United States	12 (2024)	2023 – present (2024)	

== Artillery ==
Artillery has a tradition with Brazil's marines since the 19th century. Under different names, the CFN was an artillery force until its conversion into infantry in 1847. A new artillery unit was founded in 1962 and since 1993 named Marine Artillery Battalion. The IISS estimated a total of 65 artillery pieces in service in 2024, from multiple rocket launchers to howitzers and medium mortars. This number includes the M101 howitzer, which is absent from multiple official Brazilian listings, including the 2012 National Defense White Paper. In 2025 the CFN confirmed another item had been phased out at some point, the M114.

=== Missile and rocket launchers ===
Name	Origin	Number	Period	Image
Astros FN 2020	Brazil	6 (2024)	2014 – present (2024)	

=== Howitzers ===
Name	Origin	Number	Caliber	Period	Image
M114	United States	6 (2012) 5 (2019)	155 mm	1977 – ? (phased out by 2025)	
M101	United States	15 (1997) 6 (2010); 18 (2024)	105 mm	Possibly in use in 2024	
L118	United Kingdom	18 (2019)	105 mm	1999 – present (2024)	

=== Heavy mortars ===
Name	Origin	Number	Caliber	Period	Image
Soltam K6A3	Israel	6 (2012) 7 (2019)	120 mm	1995 – present (2019) (Note: Omitted by the IISS in its 2024 report.)	

== Air defense ==
The CFN fields a single anti-aircraft artillery battery, created in 1995 and organized under the Air Combat Battalion. Its armament consists of anti-aircraft guns and man-portable air defense systems (MANPADS), both of which are exclusively for low-altitude targets.

=== Anti-aircraft guns ===
Name	Origin	Number	Period	Image
Bofors Bofi-R C70	Sweden	6 (2012)	Possibly in use in 2021 (Note: Mentioned by defense periodical Tecnologia & Defesa in 2021. Statistics provided by the Navy in 2019 listed this platform, but specified the number of platforms in service as zero.)	

=== MANPADS ===
Name	Origin	Number	Period	Image
MBDA Mistral	France	18 (2012) 10 (2019)	1994 – present (2021)	

=== Mobile surveillance radars ===
Name	Origin	Number	Period	Image
Saab Giraffe 50AT with a Hägglund BV-206D tractor	Sweden		1996 – present (2021)	
Saber M60	Brazil		2014 – present (2021)	

== Unarmored vehicles ==
According to statistics provided by the Navy, as of 2019 the Marine Corps fielded 975 unarmored and wheeled operational vehicles, of which 560 were in the light and medium categories and 415 in the heavy category.

=== Amphibious vehicles ===
Name	Origin	Number	Period	Image
GMC DUKW	United States	34	1970 – 1980s	
Biselli CamAnf	Brazil	5		

=== Trucks ===
Name	Origin	Number	Period	Image
Mercedes-Benz Unimog	Brazil	148 U2150 (2003) 90 U5000 requested;(2020) 45 delivered (2025)	1999 – present (2022)	
Ford Cargo	Brazil	15 (2013)		
Mercedes-Benz Axor			In use in 2019	
Mercedes-Benz 1725			In use in 2019	
Mercedes-Benz Atego			In use in 2022	
Iveco Tector 240 E 2013			In use in 2023	

=== Light vehicles ===
Name	Origin	Number	Period	Image
Land Rover Defender			In use in 2019; under replacement by the Agrale Marruá	
Chevrolet S10			Under replacement by the Agrale Marruá in 2013	
Agrale Marruá	Brazil		2008 – present (2013)	

== See also ==
- List of modern equipment of the Brazilian Army
- List of active Brazilian Navy ships
- Currently active military equipment by country
