= Saiban =

Saiban may refer to:

- Jabal al-Tair Island, previously known as Saiban, volcanic island at the mouth of the Red Sea about halfway between Yemen and Eritrea
- Saiban (Japanese historic figure)

== See also ==
- Saber (disambiguation)
