= Future of the Brazilian Armed Forces =

Ministry of Defence

This list shows the past, present and future strategic re-equipment and modernization programs of the Brazilian Armed Forces that was based on the documents of the National Defense Strategy of 2008, and subsequent versions of the Defense White Paper that outline the major defense programs in Brazil from 2008 until 2040. To see active equipment of the three branches, see the following pages for the Army, Navy and the Air Force.

== Active programs ==
=== Army ===
Photo	Equipment	Origin	Variants	Quantity	Production in Brazil?	Notes and references
Armoured vehicles under the Army Strategic Program Armored Forces
	Guarani	Brazil Italy	6×6; 120 mm mortar carrier personnel carrier command post armoured ambulance engineering anti-air carrier	Ordered: 1,580	✓	Ordered 2012
	Cascavel NG	Brazil	6×6; 90 mm armored car	Ordered: 98	✓	Under modernization since 2022
	Centauro II	Italy Brazil	8×8; 120 mm tank destroyer	Ordered: 98 Total planned: 221	✓	Ordered 2022
	LMV	Italy Brazil	4×4 infantry mobility vehicle	Ordered: 468	✓	Ordered 2024
Helicopters
	Black Hawk	United States	multirole helicopter	Ordered: 12	✗	Ordered 2024
Radars
	M200 Vigilante	Brazil	6×6 air defense radar	Undisclosed	✓	Under development since 2010s
	DTCBia	Brazil	counter-battery radar	Undisclosed	✓	Under development since 2020s
Other armaments
	AV-TM 300	Brazil	cruise missile	Undisclosed	✓	Under development since 2001

Planned contracts
Type	Total planned	Production in Brazil?	Notes and references
main battle tank	65	✓	Under selection process
infantry fighting vehicle	78	✓	Under selection process

=== Navy ===
Photo	Equipment	Origin	Variants	Quantity	Production in Brazil?	Notes and references
Vessels
	Riachuelo-class	Brazil France	attack submarine	Ordered: 5	✓	Ordered 2010, four diesel-electric and one nuclear
	Tamandaré-class	Brazil Germany	general purpose frigate	Ordered: 4 Total planned: 8	✓	Ordered 2020
	Macaé-class	Brazil	offshore patrol vessel	Ordered: 2	✓	Ordered 2024
	Navio Patrulha de 500 Toneladas	Brazil	offshore patrol vessel	Ordered: 11	✓	Ordered 2023
	Almirante Saldanha	Brazil	icebreaker	Ordered: 1	✓	Ordered 2022
Other armaments
	MANSUP	Brazil	anti-ship missile	Undisclosed	✓	Ordered 2023

Planned contracts
Type	Total planned	Production in Brazil?	Notes and references
attack fighter	6	✗	Under selection process

=== Air Force ===
Photo	Equipment	Origin	Variants	Quantity	Production in Brazil?	Notes and references
Aircraft
	JAS 39 Gripen	Sweden Brazil	multirole fighter	Ordered: 36 Total planned: 66	✓	Ordered 2014
	C-390 Millennium	Brazil	airlifter	Ordered: 19	✓	Ordered 2014
	EMB 314 Super Tucano	Brazil	COIN	Ordered: 68	✓	Under modernization since 2024
Radars
	Ground Master 200	Netherlands	6×6 air defense radar	Undisclosed	✗	Ordered 2024
Other armaments
	Spice	Israel	precision-guided bomb	Undisclosed	✗	Ordered 2015

Planned contracts
Type	Total planned	Production in Brazil?	Notes and references
attack fighter	24	✗	Under selection process
attack helicopter	24	✗	Under selection process
presidential aircraft	1	✗	Under selection process

=== Joint Staff of the Armed Forces ===
Photo	Equipment	Origin	Variants	Quantity	Production in Brazil?	Notes and references
	H225M	France Brazil	multirole helicopter	Ordered: 50	✓	Ordered 2012
	H125	France Brazil	multirole helicopter	Ordered: 27	✓	Ordered 2022

Planned contracts
Type	Total planned	Production in Brazil?	Notes and references
medium/high altitude (SAM)	Undisclosed	✗	Under selection process

== Concluded major programs and incorporations since 2010 ==
Branch	Photo	Equipment	Origin	Program type	Quantity	Production in Brazil?	Date of conclusion and/or incorporation
Air Force		IRIS-T	Europe	Air-to-air missile	Undisclosed	✗	Ordered 2021, operational as of February 2025
Army		Eurocopter AS565 Panther	Brazil	Modernization of helicopters	34	✓	26 November 2024
Navy		Oshkosh L-ATV	United States	Armoured vehicles	12	✗	19 July 2024
Army		MAX 1.2 AC	Brazil	Anti-tank missiles	300+	✓	26 November 2024
Army		Spike LR2	Israel	Anti-tank missiles	100+	✗	16 July 2024
Air Force		Embraer R-99	Brazil	Modernization of aircraft	5	✓	23 November 2023
Army		MaxxPro MRV-PK	United States	Armoured recovery trucks	20	✗	6 August 2023
Navy		Airbus H135	France	Transport helicopters	3	✗	2023
Air Force		Airbus A330-200	France	Strategic transport aircraft	2	✗	6 November 2022
Air Force		Meteor	Europe	BVR missiles	Undisclosed	✗	16 December 2021, operational as of February 2025
Navy		Guillobel	Spain	Submarine rescue ship	1	✗	12 May 2020
Navy		F21	France	Torpedoes	Undisclosed	✗	26 February 2020
Army		M109 A5+	United States	Modernized self-propelled howitzers	60	✗	2020s
Navy		S-70B Seahawk	United States	Naval helicopters	6	✗	2020s
Air Force		CBERS-4A	Brazil China	Earth observation satellite	1	✓	20 December 2019
Navy		Atlântico	United Kingdom	Helicopter carrier	1	✗	29 June 2018
Air Force		SGDC	France	Geostationary military communications satellite	1	✗	4 May 2017
Navy		Bahia	France	Landing platform dock	1	✗	17 December 2015
Air Force		CBERS-4	Brazil China	Earth observation satellite	1	✓	7 December 2014
Army		RBS 70 NG	Sweden	MANPADS	100+	✗	2014
Navy		Amazonas class	United Kingdom	Offshore patrol vessels	3	✗	21 June 2013
