= The Victoria Vaults =

Former pub and music venue in York, England

- The building in 2025
- Alternative names: The York Vaults; The Vicky Vaults

General information
- Status: Vacant
- Type: Public house and music venue (former)
- Location: 47–49 Nunnery Lane, York, England
- Coordinates: 53.9538°N 1.0873°W
- Year built: c. 1935; 91 years ago
- Closed: 2024; 2 years ago
- Owner: The Vaults (York) Ltd.

The Victoria Vaults is a former public house and live music venue on the corner of Nunnery Lane and St Benedict Road in York, England. Established in 1857 and rebuilt in around 1935, it operated for many years as a drinks‑led pub and later as a free house known for its live performances. The venue closed in 2024 following a change of ownership, after which the building became the subject of planning proposals and two asset of community value nominations.

== History ==
The Victoria Vaults stands on Nunnery Lane and has been part of the area since 1857, when it was a public house and brewhouse known as The Victoria. Its name evolved during the late 1880s. The present building was reconstructed around 1935, and today it is locally known as the "Vicky Vaults".

In the 1990s, alterations carried out without licensing approval led to concerns among local residents, and by 1995 the interior was reported to have been stripped out and in poor condition, with restoration estimated at £75,000 (equivalent to £154,193 in 2025). In 2002 the pub came under new management, continuing to operate primarily as a drinks‑led venue with a beer garden.

In 2014 the Victoria Vaults became a free house following several changes in ownership, enabling the licensees to operate independently of brewery ties and to expand the pub's programme of live music.

In October 2024, The Press reported that the Victoria Vaults' freehold had been sold to Appleton Estates Ltd., and that the pub would close that December. Before its closure, the venue hosted a range of live performances, including appearances by Bez of the Happy Mondays and Blondie drummer Clem Burke.

In December 2024, the local Campaign for Real Ale (CAMRA) branch secured asset of community value (ACV) status for the building, giving it protection from immediate sale and allowing community groups the opportunity to bid for it. CAMRA described the pub as a grassroots community venue of suitable scale for emerging bands. The owner subsequently challenged the listing, taking the case to a First-tier Tribunal. The case was later withdrawn, and City of York Council removed the Victoria Vaults from the register on 27 November 2025.

In August 2025, an application to convert the pub into three dwellings with a two-storey rear extension was submitted to the council. The following month, the building's owner, The Vaults (York) Ltd., submitted a separate application to change the use of the ground floor from a pub to a café. The council refused this second application in May 2026, citing the building's established role as a community and cultural live‑music venue. An appeal against the refusal was considered at a hearing in August 2026 and was dismissed by the Planning Inspectorate the following month. The inspector concluded that the conversion would result in the unjustified loss of an important cultural facility and venue, and that any benefits of the scheme did not outweigh this harm.

In June 2026, CAMRA submitted a second nomination for the Victoria Vaults to be listed as an ACV. The group argued that the pub had long operated as a live‑music venue, hosting more than 150 events a year and receiving support through the Culture Recovery Fund and a council grant. CAMRA said the building could realistically reopen under new management or as a community business, and noted interest from prospective buyers, including the Music Venue Trust. The owner objected, saying the nomination was inappropriate and included a separately rated flat, and that the building could not operate at the capacity suggested; they also cited an appraisal estimating restoration costs at about £250,000 and said prospective buyers had declined to make offers. The nomination was accepted by the council in August 2026. As of October 2026, a decision on the earlier dwellings application remained outstanding.

== Architecture ==
=== Exterior ===
The building is a two‑storey end‑terrace property of brown brick with pale stone detailing, arranged on an asymmetrical T‑plan. It has eight bays to Nunnery Lane and two to St Benedict Road, with the five bays to the right set slightly forward of the three to the left. There are two doorways flanking the five‑bay section and another entrance in the first bay. The ground‑floor windows include three 12‑light casements between the two doors, and to the left a further 12‑light casement flanked by two eight‑light casements. A 12‑light casement with stone surrounds sits at the centre of the upper floor of the five‑bay section, while the remaining upper windows are eight‑light sashes set beneath continuous sill and head bands. The roof is pitched, and a large chimney on the left gable end projects slightly between two upper‑floor sash windows. The left elevation also contains two 12‑light casements at ground level.

=== Interior ===
In 2020 the bar was rotated to run parallel with the front wall, and the two rooms were opened up into a single space with a stage at the far end.
