= Multiple Sclerosis Society of Great Britain =

Multiple Sclerosis Society
- Abbreviation: MS Society
- Formation: 1953
- Legal status: Charitable Organisation
- Purpose: To stop MS
- Headquarters: 8 City North Place, London, N4 3FU
- Location: UK
- Region served: UK
- Members: 29,000
- Official language: English
- Chief Executive: Nick Moberly
- Staff: 300
- Volunteers: 5,500
- Website: http://www.mssociety.org.uk/
- Remarks: 250+ local groups

The Multiple Sclerosis Society (MS Society) is the UK's largest charity for people affected by multiple sclerosis (MS). Based in London, it has offices and local groups in England, Northern Ireland, Scotland and Wales. It gained charitable company status in 2010.

The organisation funds research, campaigns for social and political change and provides services that help people with multiple sclerosis and their families. It also compiles the only report of its kind on prevalence and living situations for people with MS across the UK.

It is currently (2024) a member of the Neurological Alliance and the Progressive MS Alliance, which focuses on progressive multiple sclerosis.

== History ==
The MS Society was founded in 1953 by Sir Richard and Mary Cave, who were frustrated at the lack of treatments and support available for Mary's MS. Their first meeting was in Chelsea Town Hall and the organisation has grown from there into a UK-wide charity helping thousands of people living with MS.

== Activities ==
The MS Society is the UK's largest charity for people affected by multiple sclerosis (MS). It is guided by people living with MS, their friends and families.

The MS Society has a network of groups (approximately 250) and 3,000 volunteers, who help to raise awareness and funds, both locally and nationally MS Society activities include:

- funding MS research into cure, cause and quality of life, including animal experimentation since 1956 the MS Society has invested approximately £227 million of today's money in research.
- providing grants (financial assistance) to people affected by MS
- education and training on MS to those affected directly and to health professionals
- producing information on MS: Publications downloads
- running a freephone specialist MS Helpline (0808 800 8000)
- providing local support groups through local groups and regional networks
- campaigning on issues that affect people with MS, like the benefits' system, social care and access to treatment
- organising events like MS Life, MS Walk and Living with MS, educational and social events.

The MS Society receives most of its income from personal donations. It also raises money through sponsored events.

The charity has a Research Strategy Committee co-chaired by Professor Nigel Leigh, Brighton and Sussex Medical School and Stuart Nixon MBE. The MS Society recognises the need for systematic reviews of existing pre-clinical research as well as clinical research, about which the charity SABRE Research UK raises awareness.

In 2010, the MS Society Chair Tony Kennan received an OBE in the 2011 New Year Honours. In 2016, then CEO Michelle Mitchell also got an OBE in the 2016 New Year Honours.
