= List of modern equipment of the Brazilian Army =

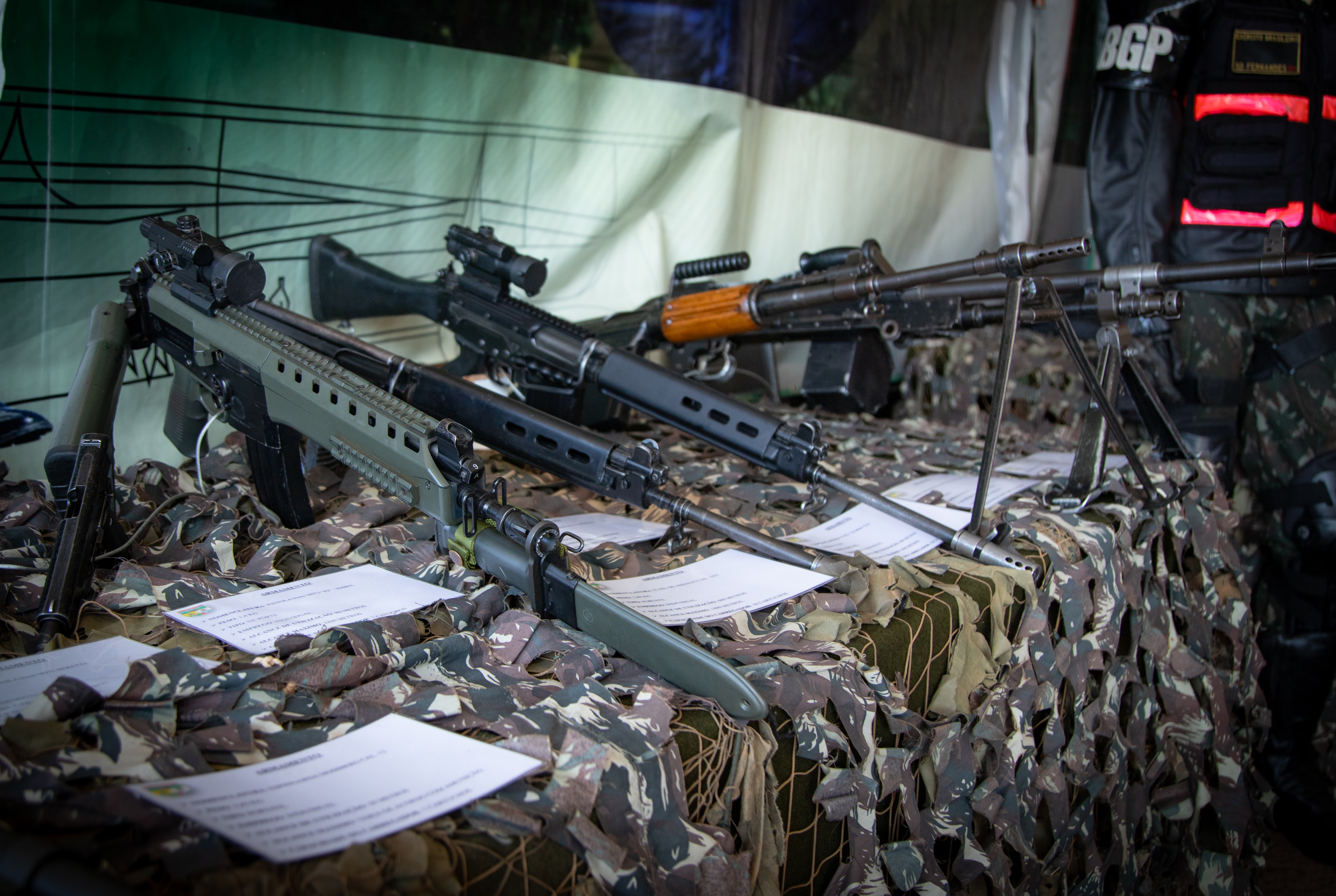
Brazilian Army rifles and machine guns in exhibition in 2023

List of equipment in service with the Brazilian Army.

== Infantry equipment ==
The Army's arsenal of firearms (individual and collective) was estimated at 299,300 weapons in 2010: 52,100 pistols, 500 revolvers, 9,100 submachine guns, 89,000 bolt-action rifles, 143,300 automatic rifles and 5,300 medium machine guns. 1,800 heavy machine guns, 800 81-millimeter mortars and 400 60-millimeter mortars were counted separately as light weapons. The International Institute for Strategic Studies (IISS) estimated 1,436 81 mm mortars in 2024 and included them in its calculation of total artillery strength.

This armamament and communications and personal protection equipment are in replacement, since 2016, by new standards defined by the Combatente Brasileiro (COBRA) project. The former service rifle, the FAL and its variants, is giving way to Imbel's IA2. Total service rifle demand to phase out the FAL family has been reported in the press as in the 140 thousand or 200 thousand range.

Individual protective equipment includes aramid helmets and bulletproof vests with no standard supplier or material. The latter must have a level III protection in NIJ standards. 2009 technical standards specified an outer covering in polyamide fabric, but did not determine a material for other components. Camouflage follows a lizard-style pattern, inspired on the French TAP47 and the Portuguese 1960s pattern. It consists of wide dark brown and dark green strokes on a lighter background.

=== Pistols ===
Name	Origin	Caliber	Period	Image
Imbel M973	Brazil	9×19mm	In use in 2023	
Taurus M975	Brazil	9×19mm	In use in 2023	
Imbel MD1 GC	Brazil	9×19mm	In use in 2023	

=== Submachine guns ===
Name	Origin	Caliber	Period	Image
Taurus M972	Brazil	9×19mm	In use in 2010	
Taurus SMT-9	Brazil	9×19mm	In use in 2015	
Heckler & Koch MP5SD	Germany	9×19mm	Under replacement by the UMP in 2016	
Heckler & Koch UMP	Germany	9×19mm	In use by the Special Operations Command in 2016	

=== Rifles ===
Name	Origin	Caliber	Period	Image
Fuzil 7,62 mm M964 (FAL)	Brazil	7,62×51mm	1964 – present, under replacement by the IA2 (2018)	
Fuzil 7,62mm M964 A1 (ParaFAL)	Brazil	7,62×51mm	1964 – present, under replacement by the IA2 (2018)	
Mosquetão 7,62 mm M968 ("MosqueFAL")	Brazil	7,62×51mm	1968 – present (2022); ceremonial and training use	
Imbel IA2	Brazil	5,56×45mm 7,62×51mm	2013 – present (2022)	
Heckler & Koch HK417	Germany	7,62×51mm	In use in 2017 by the Special Operations Command	
Heckler & Koch HK416	Germany	5,56×45mm	In use in 2020 by the Special Operations Command	
Colt M4	United States	5,56×45mm	In use in 2023 by the Special Operations Command	

=== Shotguns ===
Name	Origin	Caliber	Period	Image
Mossberg 590A1	United States	12 ga	In use in 2017	
Boito (unspecified model)	Brazil	12 ga	In use in 2023	
CBC (unspecified model)	Brazil	12 ga	In use in 2023	

=== Machine guns ===
Name	Origin	Caliber	Period	Image
Browning M2	United States	12,7×99mm	In use in 2020	
Fuzil Metralhadora 7,62 M964 FAP (Fuzil Automático Pesado)	Brazil	7,62×51mm	1970s – present, under replacement by the FN Minimi (2022)	
M971 MAG	Belgium	7,62×51mm	1970s – present, under replacement by the FN Minimi (2022)	
FN Minimi	Belgium	5,56×45mm 7,62×51mm	Pre-2013 – present (2022)	
MG3	Germany	7,62×51mm	In use in 2022 as secondary armament in Leopard 1 tanks	

=== Sniper rifles ===
Name	Origin	Caliber	Period	Image
Imbel AGLC	Brazil	7,62×51mm	In use in 2022	
Remington M40	United States	7,62×51mm	In use in 2016 by the Special Operations Command	
Remington MSR	United States	7,62×51mm	In use in 2016 by the Special Operations Command	
M110 Semi-Automatic Sniper System	United States	7,62×51mm	In use in 2017 by the Special Operations Command	

=== Grenade launchers ===
Name	Origin	Caliber	Period	Image
M79	United States	40 mm	In use in 2010	
Condor AM-600	Brazil	37/38 and 38.1 mm	In use in 2019	
ST Engineering 40GL Mk1	Singapore	40 mm	In use in 2022	
M203	United States	40 mm	In use in 2023	

=== Recoilless weapons ===
Name	Origin	Caliber	Period	Image
Carl-Gustaf M3	Sweden	84mm	1990s – present (2019)	
AT4	Sweden	84mm	1990s – present (2022)	

=== Anti-tank guided missiles ===
Name	Origin	Number	Period	Image
MAX 1.2 AC	Brazil	50 to 60 missiles, 200 ordered (2023)	2023 – present (2024)	
Spike LR2	Israel	10 launchers and 100 missiles	2024 – present	

=== Light and medium mortars ===
Name	Origin	Number	Period	Image
Morteiro 60 mm M949 AGR	Brazil		In use in 2010	
Morteiro Leve 60 mm Hotchkiss	France		In use in 2022	
Morteiro Médio 81 mm Brandt	France	651 (2024)		
Morteiro Médio 81 mm M936 AGR	Brazil	484 (2024)		
Morteiro Médio 81 mm Royal Ordnance (L16A2)	United Kingdom	72 (2024)		
Morteiro Médio Antecarga 81 mm	Brazil	92 (2024)	2013 – present (2024)	

=== Helmets ===
Name	Origin	Period	Image
Personnel Armor System for Ground Troops (PASGT)	Brazil	1993 – present (2016)	
Advanced Combat Helmet (ACH)	Brazil	In use in 2016	

=== Night vision and thermography ===
Name	Origin	Period	Image
CORAL-CR	Brazil	In use in 2017	
LORIS	Brazil	In use in 2022	
AN/PVS-7 Bravo	United States	In use in 2022	
LUNOS		In use in 2022	
MUNOS		In use in 2022	

== Armor ==
By IISS estimates, the Brazilian Army fielded over 2,250 armored fighting vehicles in 2023, the highest number in Latin America, although modern models were a minority of this total. This number includes 292 main battle tanks and 1,466 armored personnel carriers. In the Army's terminology, formations equipped with tracked vehicles are "armored" units, while those with wheeled vehicles are "mechanized".

=== Tanks ===
Name	Origin	Number	Period	Image
M60 A3TTS	United States	31 (2024)	1997 – present (2025)	
Leopard 1A1BE	Germany	41 (2024)	1997 – present (2025)	
Leopard 1A5BR	Germany	220 (2024) > 100 operational (2026)	2009 – present (2025)	

=== Tank destroyers ===
Name	Origin	Number	Period	Image
Centauro 2	Italy	2 in use, 7 in order, requirement for 98	2023 – present (2026)	

=== Armored cars ===
Name	Origin	Number	Period	Image
EE-9 Cascavel	Brazil	409 (2024)	1970s – present (2024), under partial replacement by the Centauro 2	

=== Personnel carriers ===
Name	Origin	Number	Period	Image
M113	United States	198 M113A1, 386 M113BR, 12 M113A2 (2024)	1965 – present (2024)	
EE-11 Urutu	Brazil	5 M2, 41 M6; under replacement by the VBTP-MR Guarani (2024)	1970s – present (2024)	
VBTP-MR Guarani	Italy/Brazil	Total order of 1,580 units (2016) ~575 (2024); 700+ (2024)	2014 – present (2024)	
M577 A2	United States	64 (2024)	2016 – present (2024)	
VBMT-LSR Guaicurus (Iveco LMV)	Italy/Brazil (Note: Assembled in Italy and completed with electronics, controls and military equipment in Iveco's factory in Sete Lagoas.)	48 in use, 420 on order (2024)	2018 – present (2024)	

=== Recovery vehicles ===
Name	Origin	Number	Period	Image
M578	United States	14 (2024)	1971 – present (2024)	
Bergepanzer 2	Germany	13 (2024)	1990s – present (2024)	
M88A1	United States	8 (2024)	2016 – present (2024)	
MaxxPro MRV-PK	United States	20 (2023)	2023 – present (2023)	

=== Engineering vehicles ===
Name	Origin	Number	Period	Image
Viatura Blindada Especializada Lançadora de Ponte Leopard 1 (Panzerschnellbruecke Biber)	Germany	5 (2024)	2011 – present (2024)	
Pionierpanzer 2 Dachs	Germany	5 (2024)	2010	

== Artillery ==
The IISS calculated a total of 2,263 artillery pieces in Army service in 2024, including 109 self-propelled howitzers and 412 towed howitzers. Self-propelled field artillery groups service armored brigades, while towed artillery is part of other brigades. Missile and rocket launchers are concentrated in the Army Artillery Command in Formosa, Goiás.

=== Missile and rocket artillery ===
Name	Origin	Number	Period	Image
Astros II	Brazil	44 launchers and 39 auxiliary vehicles (2023) 38 launchers (20 Mk3M and 18 Mk6) (2024)	1990s – present (2024)	
AV-VBL	Brazil		In use in 2021 as a specialized vehicle in Astros II batteries	

=== Self-propelled howitzers ===
Name	Origin	Number	Caliber	Period	Image
M109	United States	109 (37 M109A3, 40 M109A5, 32 M109A5+)	155 mm	1999 – present (2024)	
M992 A2	United States	40 (2022)		In service in 2022 as the M109's resupply vehicle	

=== Towed howitzers ===
Name	Origin	Number	Caliber	Period	Image
M114	United States	81 (2024)	155 mm	1940s – present (2024)	
M101/M102	United States	231 (2024)	105 mm	1940s – present (2024)	
OTO Melara Mod 56	Italy	60 (2024)	105 mm	1970s – present (2024)	
L118	United Kingdom	40 (2024)	105 mm	1991 – present (2024)	

=== Heavy mortars ===
Name	Origin	Number	Period	Image
MO 120-RT (Mortier 120mm Rayé Tracté) (Note: The IISS doesn't mention this model in its 2024 report. InfoDefensa mentioned in 2022 that the Army "still has" the model.)	France	~200 (2022)		
Morteiro Pesado 120 mm M2 Raiado	Brazil	~400 (2022) 268 (2024)		

== Air defense ==
Having deactivated its towed antiaircraft guns in 2023, the Army's sole air defense platforms are self-propelled antiaircraft guns and man-portable missiles, both operated by the artillery arm. All available systems are restricted to defense against low altitude targets.

=== Self-propelled guns ===
Name	Origin	Number	Period	Image
Krauss-Maffei Gepard 1A2	Germany	34	2013 – present (2023)	

=== MANPADS ===
Name	Origin	Number	Period	Image
9K338 Igla-S	Russia		2015 – present (2023)	
RBS 70 Mk.2 and NG	Sweden		2014 – present (2023)	

=== Mobile surveillance radars ===
Name	Origin	Number	Period	Image
Saber M60	Brazil		2011 – present (2024)	

== Unarmored vehicles ==
Unarmored vehicles in Army service are classified by category (administrative or operational) and usage (transport, tractor, trailer, semi-trailer and special). Administrative vehicles perform routine activities, confidential missions and logistical support in exercises and military operations. Operational vehicles have direct tactical or logistical roles in exercises and operations. 8,500 wheeled unarmored vehicles, from fuel tankers to refrigerated trucks, were acquired from 2012 to 2015, equivalent to a renewal of 40% of the inventory, according to General Staff figures.

In the truck sector, the main supplier by around 2015 was MAN's Latin American division, provider of a fleet of over five thousand Volkswagen vehicles. The standard off-road light vehicle in 2019 was Agrale's Marruá. The motorcycle inventory comprised 699 units in 2012: 193 from Harley-Davidson, the largest in service, 307 from Honda and 168 from Yamaha. The remainder was older, from no longer extant brands such as Agrale.

=== Trucks ===
Name	Origin	Number	Period	Image
Mercedes-Benz Unimog 4x4 Série U	Germany		1967 – present (2024)	
Terex UAI M1-50 6x6	Brazil		1980s – present (2015?)	
Mercedes-Benz LAK 1418	Brazil		1992 – ? (in use in 2017)	
Ford Cargo	Brazil		1987 – present (2022)	
Volkswagen Worker	Brazil	860 ordered (2013)	2007 – present (2024)	
Mercedes-Benz Atron			2007–2008 – present (2023)	
Mercedes-Benz Axor			2007–2008 – present (2023)	
VW 31.390 Prime			In use in 2018	
Mercedes-Benz Atego			In use in 2019	
Iveco Stralis	Italy		In use in 2019	
Volvo NL 12 360			In use in 2019	
Tatra 815 (T-815-7 and T-815-2)	Czech Republic		2019 – present (2021)	
Mercedes-Benz Munck			In use in 2019	
Mercedes-Benz Accelo			In use in 2021	

=== Buses ===
Name	Origin	Number	Period	Image
Comil Svelto	Brazil	135 new (2013)	2003 – present (2013)	
Volksbus Mascarello			In use in 2019	
Volare W9	Brazil		In use in 2020	
Agrale Mascarelo GranMini	Brazil		In use in 2022	
Volare Attack 9	Brazil		In use in 2022	
Fiat Ducato Minibus	Italy		In use in 2022	

=== Light vehicles ===
Name	Origin	Number	Period	Image
Volkswagen Kombi (pickup)	Brazil		1961 – present (2021)	
Chevrolet Série 10	Brazil		1975 – present (2021)	
Toyota Bandeirante	Brazil		1980s – present (2019)	
Land Rover Defender	Brazil		1990s – present (2019)	
Agrale Marruá family	Brazil	> 4 000 (2019)	2006 – present (2019)	
AM2	Brazil	> 4 000 (2019)	2006 – present (2019)	
AM11	Brazil	> 4 000 (2019)	2006 – present (2019)	
AM20	Brazil	> 4 000 (2019)	2006 – present (2019)	
AM21	Brazil	> 4 000 (2019)	2006 – present (2019)	
AM23	Brazil	> 4 000 (2019)	2006 – present (2019)	
AM31	Brazil	> 4 000 (2019)	2006 – present (2019)	
Chivunk	Brazil	10 pilot batch vehicles in adaptation (2023)		
Ford F-350			In use in 2012	
Troller T4	Brazil		2004 – ?	
Mitsubishi Pajero			In use in 2021	
Toyota Hilux	Argentina		In use in 2020	
Ford Ranger			In use in 2021	
Volkswagen Gol City			In use in 2019	
Renault Master dCI			In use in 2019	
Ford Fiesta Sedan			In use in 2022	
Nissan March SV 1.6			In use in 2022	
Mercedes-Benz Greencar			In use in 2016	
Peugeot 408			In use in 2021	
Chevrolet Spin LTZ			In use in 2021	
Fiat Doblo Essence	Italy		In use in 2021	
Fiat Punto Sporting	Italy		In use in 2021	
Fiat Ducato, Peugeot Boxer, Citroen Jumper			In use in 2021	
Fiat Marea ELX	Italy		In use in 2021	
Fiat Uno Mile	Italy		In use in 2021	
Fiat Toro	Italy		In use in 2021	
Fiat Strada	Italy		In use in 2021	
Fiat Palio Young	Italy		In use in 2021	
Ford Fiesta Hatch			In use in 2021	
Ford Focus Sedan			In use in 2021	
Ford Fusion			In use in 2021	
Mercedes-Benz Sprinter			In use in 2021	
Iveco Daily	Italy		In use in 2021	
SsangYong Actyon Sports GLX			In use in 2021	
Nissan Frontier			In use in 2021	
Nissan Versa			In use in 2021	
Mahindra CD/CS 2.2 HWK			In use in 2021	
Renault Logan Expression			In use in 2021	
Renault Master			In use in 2021	

=== Motorcycles ===
Name	Origin	Number	Period	Image
Yamaha XT			In use in 2021	
Honda XRE			In use in 2019	
Honda NXR			In use in 2021	
Harley-Davidson Road King Police		193 (2012)		

== Water transport ==
Combat engineering units field small boats, crosswalks, rafts and pontoon bridges for river crossings. In the Pantanal and Amazon theaters, where options for ground transport are few, other units resort to river transport. Manaus, Amazonas, headquarters a peculiar logistical unit, the Amazon Military Command's Boat Center (Portuguese: Centro de Embarcações do Comando Militar da Amazônia, CECMA).

=== Motorboats ===
Name	Origin	Number	Period	Image
Embarcação Patrulha Grupo (EPG) & Embarcação Patrulha Esquadra (EPE) ("voadeiras")				
Guardian 25	United States	12 (2014)	2014 – present (2023)	
DGS Raptor 999	Brazil	2 (2021)	2021 – present (2023)	
COTECMAR Lancha de Patrulha Ribeirinha (LPR) 40 Mk2B	Colombia	2 (2013)	2013 – present (2023)	

=== Catamarans ===
Name	Origin	Number	Period	Image
Jacaretinga class		4 (2021)	2020 – present (2021)	

=== Ferries ===
Name	Origin	Number	Period	Image
4700 ton		11 (2023)		
1000 ton		1 (2023)		
400 ton		1 (2023)		

=== Tugboats ===
Name	Origin	Number	Period	Image
Type1 and Type 2		6 (2020)		

=== Ferry boats ===
Name	Origin	Number	Period	Image
		3 in the CECMA (2020), 2 in the Northern Military Command(2023)		

=== River crossings ===
Name	Origin	Number	Period	Image
Aluminum crosswalk			In use in 2024	
Light raft			In use in 2019	
Mabey Logistic Support Bridge	United Kingdom		In use in 2013	
General Dynamics Floating Support Bridge			In use in 2018	
Ribbon-type Krupp FFB 2000 raft			In use in 2019	
General Dynamics Improved Ribbon Bridge		2 (2020)	2019 – present (2020)	

== Aircraft ==
Brazilian Army Aviation in its current format, created in 1986, has no fixed-wing aircraft and flies rotary-wing aircraft (helicopters) and unmanned aerial vehicles. The helicopters, 95 in total in 2023, are grouped in two categories, maneuver and reconnaissance and attack. There is no dedicated attack helicopter. A bid to acquire Short C-23 Sherpa transport planes, which would resurrect fixed-wing aviation in the Army, peaked with a June 2020 presidential decree authorizing the operation of this type of aircraft. This decree was soon revoked after heavy criticism from Brazilian Air Force officers.

== See also ==
- Future of the Brazilian Armed Forces#Army
- List of equipment of the Brazilian Marine Corps
- Currently active military equipment by country
