= Michele Mitchell =

Michele or Michelle Mitchell may refer to:

- Michele Mitchell (diver) (born 1962), American diver
- Michele Mitchell (journalist) (born 1970), American filmmaker, journalist and author
- Michelle Mitchell (born 1972), chief executive of Cancer Research UK
- Michelle Mitchell (née Andrews, born 1971), Australian field hockey player
