= Michelle Mitchell =

UK activist (born 1972)

Michelle Mitchell OBE
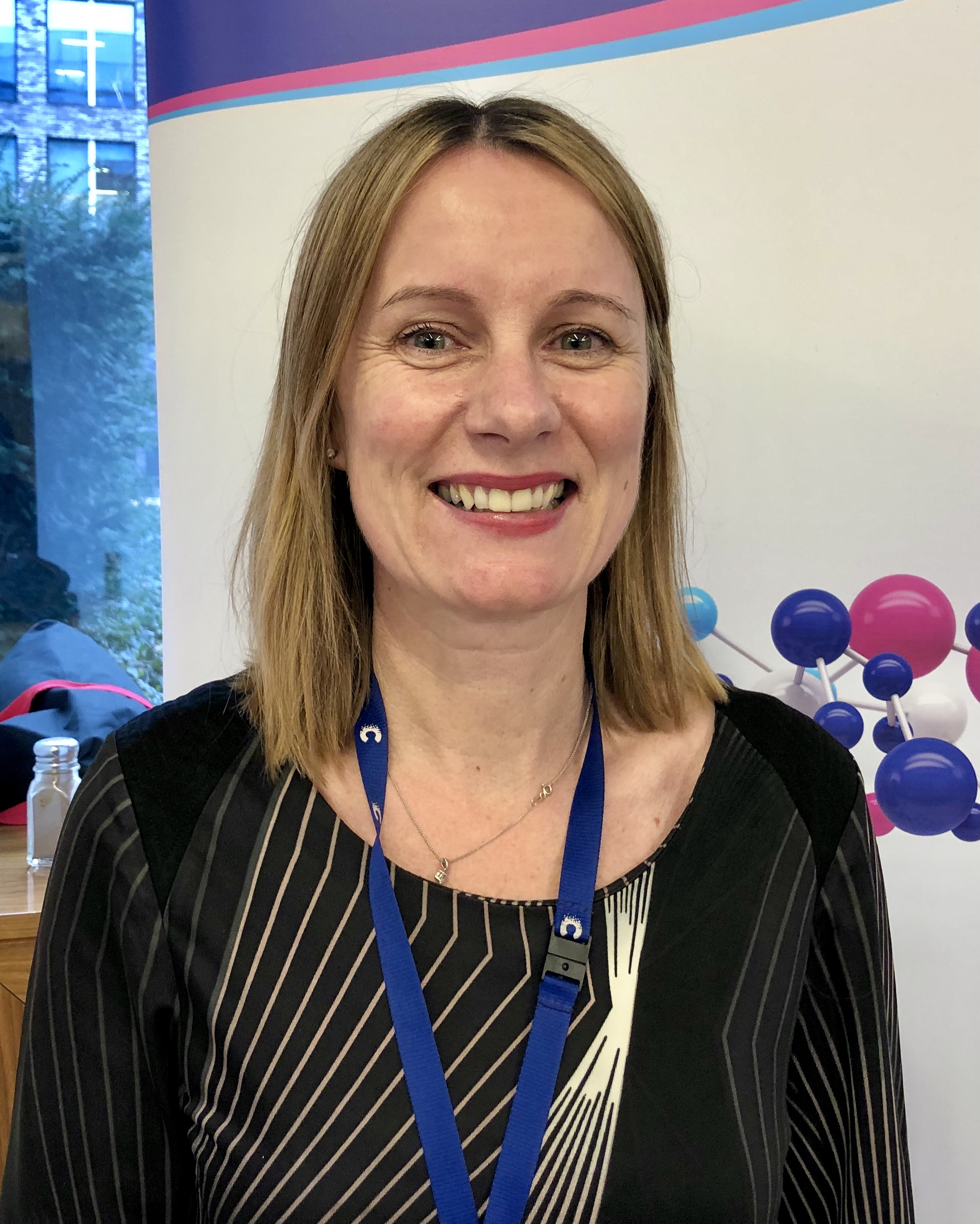
- Born: Michelle Elizabeth Mitchell; 1972 (age 53–54)
- Education: University of Manchester; University College London; Insead; Harvard Kennedy School
- Employer(s): Age UK; Multiple Sclerosis Society of Great Britain; National Society for the Prevention of Cruelty to Children; Charter 88
- Organisation(s): Young Women's Trust; King's Fund; Power to Change Trust; Fawcett Society

Michelle Elizabeth Mitchell OBE is the chief executive of Cancer Research UK. She has worked extensively in the charity sector, having led Age UK, the Multiple Sclerosis Society of Great Britain and the Fawcett Society.

== Education and early career ==
Mitchell grew up in Ellesmere Port. She was the first in her family to attend university, and studied economics at the University of Manchester, earning a bachelor's degree in 1994. She worked for Donald Dewar after graduating, completing a master's degree at University College London in political administration in the evenings. In 1997 she joined Charter 88, a political campaigning group who worked on the House of Lords Reform Bill 2012. She earned an international executive diploma from INSEAD in 2005 and an innovations in governance qualification from the John F. Kennedy School of Government in 2006.

== Career ==
Mitchell was appointed the governmental affairs adviser to the National Society for the Prevention of Cruelty to Children (NSPCC) in 2000. Mitchell worked at Age Concern as Head of Public Affairs from 2002 and Director of Communications from 2007. From 2005 to 2008 Mitchell was Chair of Trustees of the Fawcett Society.

She worked as Charity Director at Age UK from 2010. Here, Mitchell launched Let's Talk Money to get the charity to tackle several political issues, aiming to improve old people's incomes. She spoke about her work on Woman's Hour. When she left she appointed Hannah Pearce and Angela Kitching to job share as Head of External Relations.

Mitchell was Chief Executive of the Multiple Sclerosis Society of Great Britain from 2013 to 2018. She oversaw a 40% increase in access to treatments for MS and launched a £100 million fundraising campaign. During this time she wrote regularly for the Huffington Post. She has extensive non-executive experience, including as a non-executive director of NHS England and a Trustee of the King's Fund and Power to Change Trust.

Mitchell was appointed the Chief Executive of Cancer Research UK in 2018. She is responsible for the leadership and direction of one of the world's leading cancer charitys dedicated to saving lives through research.

During her tenure at Cancer Research UK, Mitchell has overseen the publication of Longer, Better Lives: A manifesto for cancer research and care, which called on the next UK government to introduce measures that could help prevent 20,000 cancer deaths every year by 2040. She also led the development of More Research, Less Cancer, the largest ever philanthropic campaign by a UK charity.

=== Awards and honours ===
Mitchell was appointed Order of the British Empire (OBE) in the 2016 New Year Honours for services to Older People and the Voluntary Sector. She was named by Cranfield University as one of the 100 Women to Watch in 2018, and was recognised as one of the 100 Influential Women in Oncology by OncoDaily. She joined the University of Cambridge's Homerton College as an Honorary Fellow in 2023.
