= Saber Sangar =

- Born: May 1953; Parwan Province Afghanistan
- Other names: Sangar
- Occupation(s): Political and Military
- Known for: An Afghan political and military leader.
- Notable work: battalion (kandak) commander of Afghan Army in Parwan province, In President Najibullah government was chief of Parwan province KHAD, Deputy chief of Afghanistan State Intelligence Agency, Currently CEO of Afghan Community in Ukraine, President of Wahdat e Meli foundation and senior adviser.

General Saber Sangar was born in Parwan Province Afghanistan. An Afghan political and military leader. He was a military commander during the government of Mohammad Najibullah. When he was 23 years old, he was a battalion commander of the Afghan Army in Parwan province. He was the chief of the Parwan province branch of the KHAD, and later became deputy chief of the Afghanistan State Intelligence Agency.
