= Saber Hussain =

Saudi Arabian footballer

Personal information
- Full name: Saber Hussain Housah
- Date of birth: November 5, 1981 (age 44)
- Place of birth: Saudi Arabia
- Height: 1.81 m (5 ft 11 1/2 in)
- Position: Striker

Youth career
- Ohod

Senior career*
Years	Team	Apps	(Gls)
2003–2006	Ohod		
2005	→ Al-Taawon (loan)		
2006–2009	Al-Hazm		
2009	→ Al-Ta'ee (loan)		
2009–2011	Al-Faisaly		
2011–2013	Al-Ta'ee		
2013–2014	Al-Ansar		
2014–2015	Ohod		
2015–2016	Al-Ansar		
2016–2017	Al-Majd		
- * Club domestic league appearances and goals

Saber Hussain (Arabic: صابر حسين; born November 5, 1981) is a Saudi football player who plays striker.
