= Systems Approach for Better Education Results =

World Bank Group initiative

The World Bank Group's Systems Approach for Better Education Results (SABER) program helps countries around the world "systematically strengthen their education systems." It produces data on education institutions, analyzes and evaluates their quality, and provides decision makers, school administrators, academia, and education specialists with information that can be used to foster structured and informed policy dialogue on how to most effectively strengthen education policies and policy implementation that can improve learning outcomes on the ground. SABER is one of the initiatives derived from the WBG's Education Sector Strategy 2020 and it "lies at the center of the World Bank Group's thinking on education."

== Background ==
In 2011, the WBG launched the "Education Sector Strategy 2020: Learning for All", with the aim to "Invest early, invest smartly, and invest for all." The strategy "holds that investments in education should achieve Learning for All because growth, development, and poverty reduction depend on the knowledge and skills that people acquire, not the number of years that they sit in a classroom." SABER underpins Learning for All by focusing on three areas including (a) Public access to systematic, accurate, and comparable data on the quality of countries' education policies and the quality of implementation of those policies; (b) Awareness and utilization of these data by countries and development partners in sector analyses, policy dialogue, and planning processes; (c) More informed global discussion and debate about strengthening education systems to increase countries' learning for all. These areas are believed to play a big role in education reform on both a country level and global level. SABER relies on partnerships as it serves as a public tool for education systems on a global level. The partners of SABER include Arab League Educational, Cultural and Scientific Organization (ALECSO), Australian Government Department of Foreign Affairs and Trade (DFAT), Bank Netherlands Partnership Program (BNPP), Children's Investment Fund Foundation (CIFF), Department for International Development (DFID), Global Partnership for Education, Japan International Cooperation Agency (JICA), Korea-World Bank Partnership Facility, Organisation for Economic Co-operation and Development (OECD), Russia Education Aid for Development (READ), Teachers Task Force for Education For All (EFA), United Nations Educational Scientific and Cultural Organization (UNESCO), United Nations Children's Fund (UNICEF), and World Food Programme (WFP).

== Methodology ==
Policy intent tools, SABER's initial focus, evaluate enabling environments by examining education policies as they exist on paper. Domain specific policy implementation tools, by contrast, assess the efficacy of these policies and institutions in practice at the classroom level. The new SABER Service Delivery (SABER SD) examines what happens in the classroom to identify policy implementation gaps within and across countries. The forthcoming Systems Snapshot tool will elucidate linkages between the domains to explore SABER's overall systems approach.

== Topics ==
There are thirteen policy areas, known as domains, that are currently evaluated through SABER:

1. Early Childhood Development (ECD)
2. Education Management and Information Systems (EMIS)
3. Education Resilience (ERA)
4. Engaging the Private Sector (EPS)
5. Equity and Inclusion (E&I)
6. Information and Communication Technologies (ICT)
7. School Autonomy and Accountability (SA&A)
8. School Finance (SF)
9. School Health and School Feeding (SH&SF)
10. Student Assessment (SA)
11. Teachers (T)
12. Tertiary Education (TE)
13. Workforce Development (WfD)

== Website ==
All data collected through the use of SABER tools is publicly available through the SABER website. This website showcases various forms of data on education system policies, such as reports and analyses (regional and country levels), raw survey data, ratings data, and instruments. In addition, the data is also accessible though the Smarter Education Systems interactive tool, as well as through the WBG's EdStats tool.

== See also ==
- World Bank Group
- World Bank
