= Mauser Model 1908 =

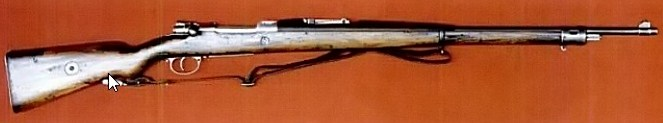
- A Mauser Model 1908
- Type: Bolt-action rifle
- Place of origin: Germany

Service history
- In service: 1908–present
- Used by: Brazil; Uruguay; Dominican Republic
- Wars: Contestado War; Tenentism; Revolution of 1930; Constitutionalist Revolution; Cangaço conflict; Dominican Civil War; Araguaia Guerrilla War

Production history
- Manufacturer: DWM; Itajubá arms factory
- Produced: 1908−1968
- Variants: Model 1908/34; Model 1935; M1949; M954; M968

Specifications
- Mass: 3.8 kilograms (8.4 lb)
- Length: 125 centimetres (49 in)
- Barrel length: 74.3 centimetres (29.3 in)
- Cartridge: 7×57mm Mauser.30-06 Springfield; 7.62×51mm NATO
- Action: Bolt-action
- Feed system: 5-round stripper clip, internal magazine
- Sights: Iron sights adjustable to 2,000 metres (2,200 yd)

The Mauser Model 1908 were series of Gewehr 98 pattern bolt-action rifles. First produced by Deutsche Waffen und Munitionsfabriken (DWM) and Mauser, they were exported to Uruguay and Brazil. In this latter country, Brazilian War Material Industry produced upgraded versions until the rifle was replaced by the FN FAL.

== Design ==
=== Model 1908 ===
The Model 1908 rifle was a copy of the Mauser Gewehr 98, chambered in 7×57mm Mauser and with a simple tangent-leaf sight and a longer upper hand-guard. A variant was also shortened to a 1.19 m (47 in)-short rifle configuration.

=== Models 1935 and 08/34 ===
The 7mm Mauser-made Model 1935 rifle was similar to the Model 1908 but featured grasping grooves. A short rifle variant also existed. Not to be confused with the Czech-made Model 1908/34 police carbine (Vz. 12/33), the Model 1908/34 short rifle was an upgraded version of the Model 1908 using local wood.

=== Later variants ===
The Mosquetão Itajubá M1949 was a 08/34 short rifle chambered in .30-06 Springfield..

The Mosquetão 7,62mm Modelo 968 or M968 was one of the last Mauser service rifles produced. This rifle fired the 7.62×51mm NATO cartridge, a grenade launcher was fixed to its barrel and its stock was reinforced with rubber. These features were also used on the FN FAL, hence the Mosquefal nickname.

== History and service ==
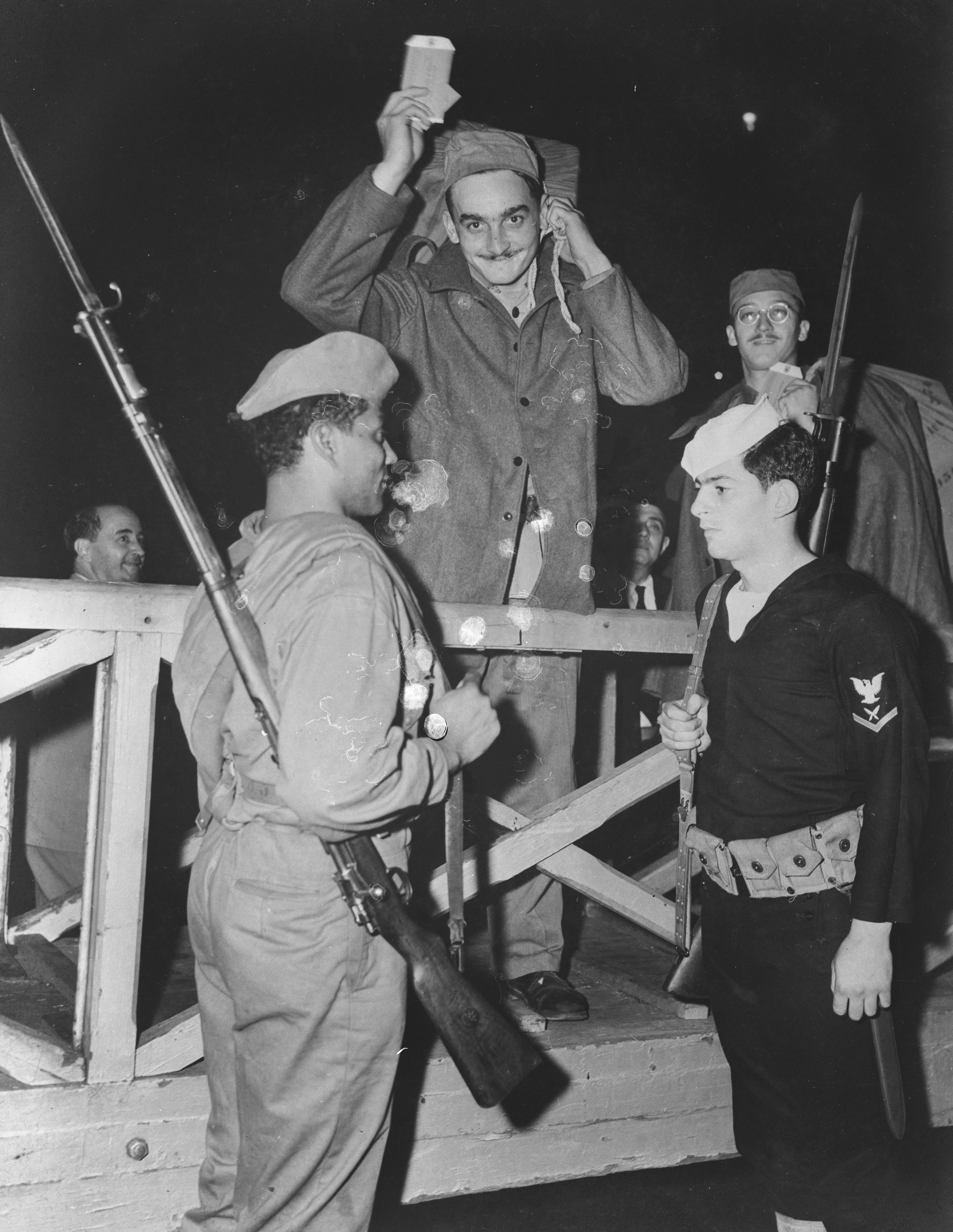
A Brazilian soldier (left) with a Mauser M1908 (or M1908/34), standing in front of an American sailor with a M1903 Springfield rifle.

Large numbers of Model 1908 rifles and short rifles were purchased between 1908 and 1914. While DWM was the main manufacturer, Mauser produced 100,000 Model 1908 with DWM Oberndorf stamps. Some Mauser 1908 saw combat during the Contestado War. Later, Model 1935 rifles and short rifles were purchased in unknown quantities from Mauser. They were fielded against the Cangaço bandits. To improve the country's independence from foreign suppliers, the Model 08/34 was produced in Itajuba.

Uruguay received DWM-made Model 1908 rifles and short rifles before 1914 and used them into the 1950s. Several Mystery Mausers, similar to the Model 1908 but chambered in 7.92×57mm Mauser, can be found with Arabic markings or an hexagram.

In the early 1950s, surplus Brazilian 1908 rifles and short rifles were exported to the Dominican Republic. The Brazilian markings were replaced by Dominican markings and the rifles were designated Model 1953. During the US intervention in the Dominican Civil War, these Mauser rifles were found to be very effective since they had longer range than the M16 rifle.

Post-war, Itajubá plant produced the M1949 and M954 short rifles for the Brazilian armed forces. During the Araguaia Guerrilla War, the rebels were able to acquire 7.62 Mausers from the state police of Pará. The M968 was produced for the Brazilian police.

== Gallery ==
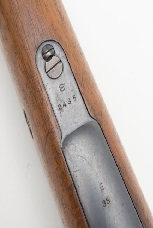
details of rifle 1908

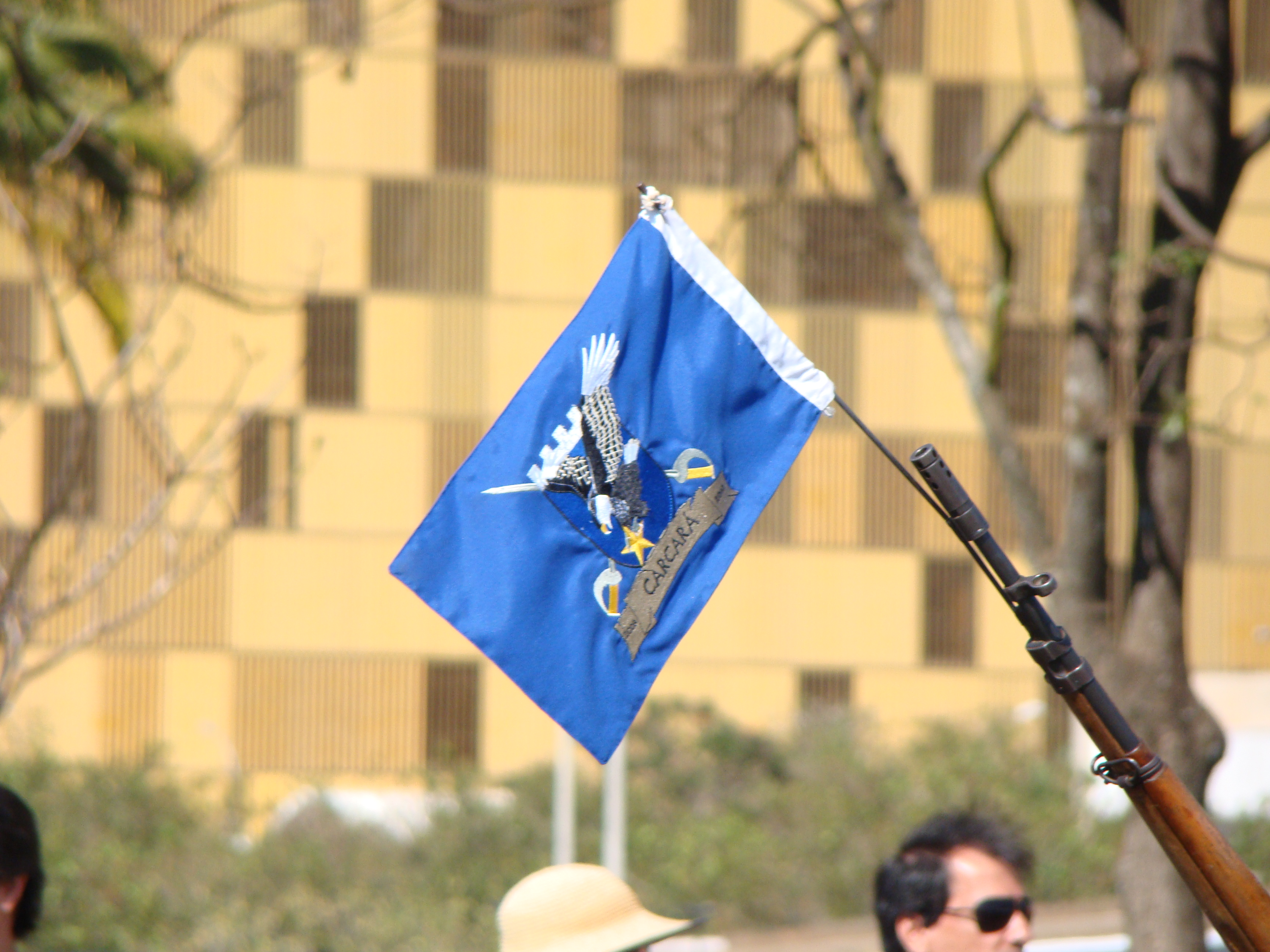
A Mauser M968 in a ceremony of the Military Police in 2010.

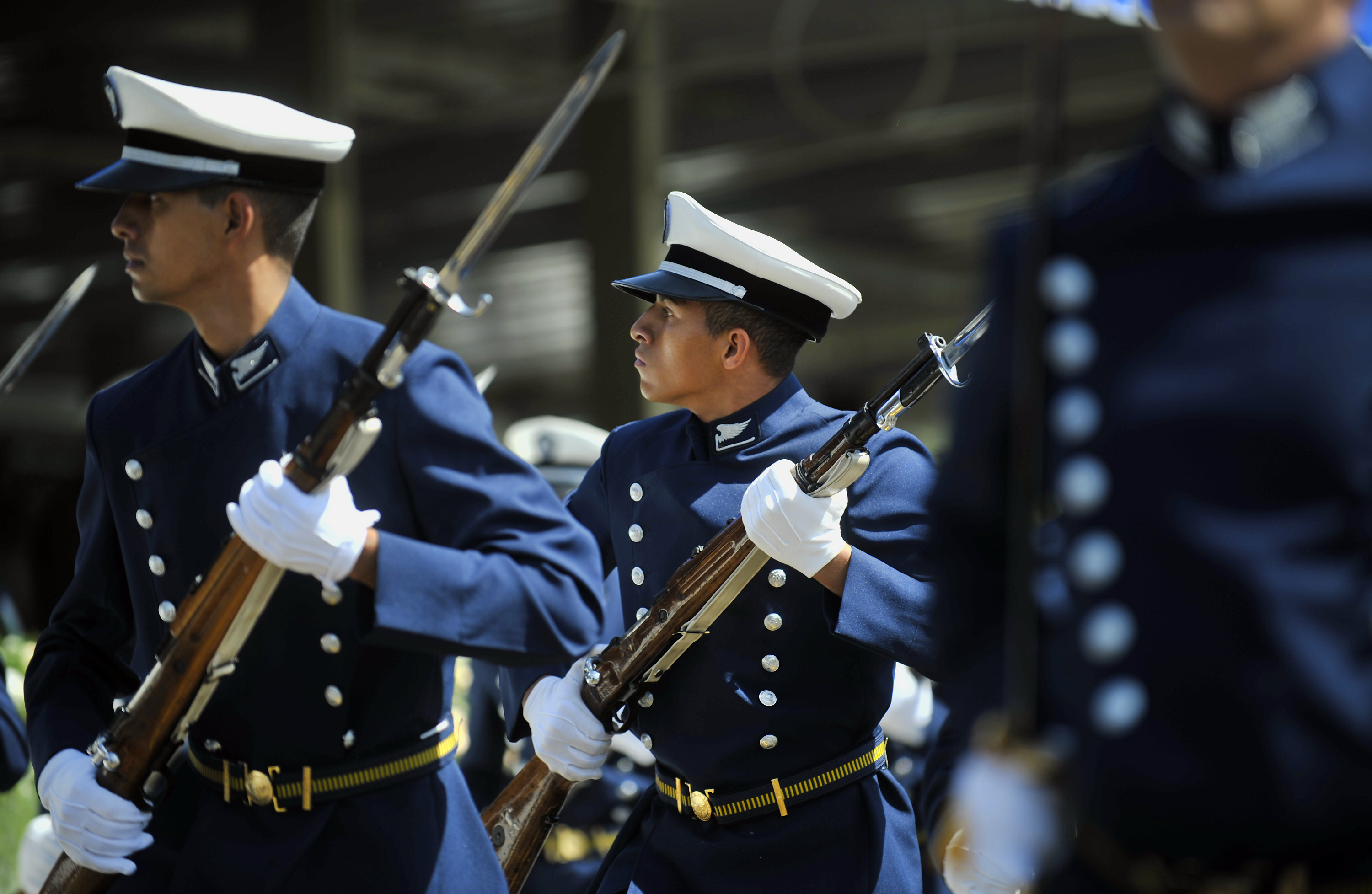
Brazilian soldiers in 2013 with Mauser 1935 or 08/34 short rifles.
