= Ceiba (disambiguation) =

Ceiba is a genus of trees.

Ceiba may also refer to:

- La Ceiba, a port city on the northern coast of Honduras
- Ceiba, Puerto Rico, a town and a municipality in northeast Puerto Rico
- Ceiba, Cidra, Puerto Rico, a barrio
- Ceiba, Las Piedras, Puerto Rico, a barrio
- Ceiba, Vega Baja, Puerto Rico, a barrio
- Ceiba, a botanical journal
- CEIBA Intercontinental, an airline
