= Community business =

Communities come together and set up community businesses to address challenges they face together.

There are many types of community business including shops, farms, pubs and call centres. What they all have in common is that they are accountable to their community and that the profits they generate deliver positive local impact, such as boosting the local economy.

Similar to social enterprises, community businesses are committed to positively benefiting society through trading in a sustainable way. All profit from a community business is reinvested in the local area. Unlike social enterprises, community businesses are focused on benefiting a specific local geographic area.

Community businesses also have similarities to place-based charitable trusts which manage assets. However, a community business is accountable to its beneficiary community which can mean local people being involved in formal participation or even actual legal ownership.

== Historic UK development ==
The notion of community business is linked to the notion of community ownership, and more widely co-operative models of ownership.

In his History of Community Asset Ownership, Steve Wyler argues that community ownership represents a strain of English socio-political thoughts and activism that can be traced back to the progressive removal of common land from the Norman Conquest and thereafter, where periodically revolts around access to common resources were quashed by the state, usually with punitive measures against protestors and the districts they had come from. At the same time, the notion of recreating the common access to wealth fed into the concept of the ‘commonwealth’ that animated the thought of Robert Kett, Gerrard Winstanley, the Levellers, the Diggers and the Ranters.

Having failed to prevent the legal privatisation of resources completed by the Inclosure Acts, subsequent efforts turned to developing intentional communities defined by common control or ownership of assets, notably land, such as Owenite models, Feargus O'Connor’s Chartist National Land Company and most successfully, the Co-operative Retail movement and Ebenezer Howard’s Garden Cities.

In the late 1920 in response to the collapse of local industry, British Quakers organised philanthropic aid to the Welsh community of Brynmawr but instead of external relief being applied to the community, that community were empowered to control the businesses created to employ local workers and also control the resulting economic benefits. The Brynmawr Experiment survived until the outbreak of the Second World War, where the community controlled businesses closed due to labour being re-allocated for war production.

The growth of the post-war state meant that many of the challenges for which community activists had created community businesses were being addressed through government action, and with official policies of full employment and welfare and housing provision, a generation avoided the deprivations and insecurities that had driven their forebears. However, the critique of the state from the New Right and New Left found expression in the growth of the Development Trusts in the 1970s and beyond. The progressive benevolence of bureaucratic policymaking was met by a criticism of an over-mighty state which paid no attention to the particularities of communities, and drove a diverse range of protests against roadbuilding and slum clearance.

In Scotland, communities threatening by slum clearance instead organised community-owned and led renovations and protests against absentee landlords spurred activism to acquire highland and Island land to be community-owned. These efforts were boosted by the passage of the 2003 Land Reform Act in Scotland which gave community organisations the right of first refusal on land coming up for sale, and the right to buy upon meeting an independently-assessed purchase price for certain crofting areas.

The development of railway preservation was an early post-war example of community business, blending volunteers with paid staff and trading from passenger income.

== Recent UK developments ==
The Plunkett Foundation have overseen the development of a range of rural retail outlets, predominantly shops and pubs, owned by their members, with successful trading performance.

In 2014, the UK’s Big Lottery Fund agreed to endow Power to Change, a new charitable trust to support the growth and development of community enterprise. A report commissioned by Power to Change mapped the Community Enterprise Sector in England and described five distinct types of Community Business:

- Public asset managers e.g. community-run libraries, where publicly-run and funded service is made viable using a combination of government contracts, new revenue streams, and volunteer and other goodwill support.
- Business savers, such as community-run pubs or fan-owned teams take an enterprise failing under private ownership and run it successfully under community ownership. These are often local monopoly enterprises.
- Community start-ups, e.g. community energy schemes are social enterprises in the standard model, focussed on a specific place .
- Cross-subsidisers use a traditional business model to support a more charitable service which would struggle to trade its way to sustainable operation on its own revenues.
- Clubs are typically low-cost and low-income e.g. local sports teams; they derive their income from providing a service to their members, and usually have limited goals beyond the meeting of member needs.

Social finance also identified 13 sectors in which community businesses were operating (values estimated by Social Finance in their report)

	Organisations	Income	Assets	Staff	Volunteers
Community shops	330	£55M	£10M	1000	8000
Community pubs	22	£3M	£7M	300	300
Crafts and other production	500	£45M	-	1500	2500
Digital	50	£5M	£10M	100	500
Food and farming	1000	£45M	£25M	2000	1700
Multi-use community facility	175	£20M	£65M	750	750
Library	200	£4M	£30M	300	6000
Community housing	250	£40M	£250M	400	5000
Community transport	1000	£150M	£100M	11500	60000
Public land management	300	£5M	£3M	300	4000
Sports and leisure	400	£400M	£420M	5000	12000
Tourism, heritage, arts and culture	100	£20M	£50M	500	1000
Community energy	100	£4M	£30M	150	1500

=== Power to Change definition ===
In order to develop eligibility criteria for funding, Power to Change have developed a typology of a community business, drawing on the Social Finance report they commissioned. They identify 4 criteria for a Community Business:

- Locally rooted
- Community controlled
- Trading business
- Operate for the benefit of community

=== Legal rights for community businesses ===
Following the 2003 Land Reform Act in Scotland, communities in England were given certain rights in the 2011 Localism Act passed by the UK Parliament. These were the right to bid, giving them a power modeled on the Scottish Act, but without the legal right for their offer to trigger a sale that Scottish community organisations enjoyed. Many of the land and buildings nominated as Assets of Community Value have been by community organisations seeking the opportunity to buy those assets in the event of a sale by their current owners.

In Scotland, the 2015 Community Empowerment Act extended the provisions of the 2003 Land Reform Act to include all of Scotland, not just certain defined Highland and Island communities. The Act also includes a power for Scottish Ministers to enable football fans to lodge bids for the limited companies that run their football clubs, on which the Scottish Government undertook consultation in 2016
