= Saber Rastikerdar =

Iranian programmer and font developer (1986 - 2023)

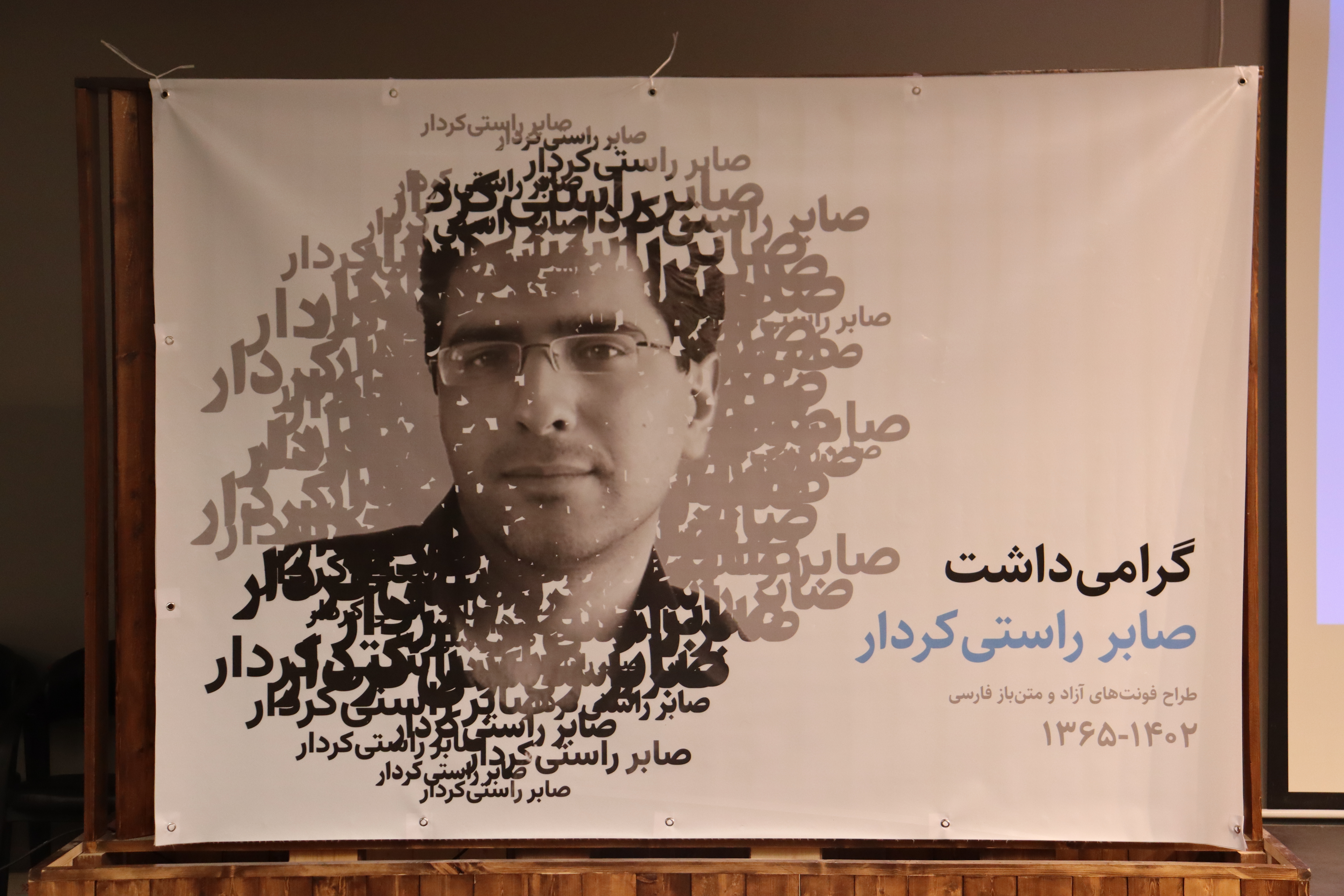
- Born: December 11, 1986; Bandar Abbas
- Died: 13 November 2023 (aged 36); Fasa
- Occupations: Programmer, font developer and Type designer
- Known for: Vazirmatn font
- Website: rastikerdar.github.io

Saber Rastikardar (December 11, 1986 – November 13, 2023) was an Iranian programmer, font developer, type designer, and an active member of the FOSS community. Vazirmatn, which was his most important font, was added to the Google Fonts collection in 2022, and the same font was used in the desktop version of Telegram messenger to display Persian and Arabic characters.

== Activities ==
=== Vazirmatn Persian font ===
Vazirmatn font (formerly Vazir) is a Persian-Arabic typeface family with 9 weights, which was started in 2015 under the name of Vazir with the idea of a new, simple, and readable typeface suitable for web pages and applications. From version 32, the name of Vazir font was changed to Vazirmatn. The design of Vazirmatn has been done in FontForge. For Latin letters, Vazirmatn is combined with Google's Roboto font by a build script. On February 17, 2022, it was announced that this font was added to the Google Font collection on the Vazirmatn font GitHub page, and it was added to Google Fonts on March 10, 2022. Vazirmatn font (version 27 and later) supports Persian, Arabic, Iranian Azerbaijani, Kurdish, Pashto, Urdu, Gilaki, Uzbek, Kazakh and Balochi languages.

== Personal life and death ==
Rastikerdar was born in Bandar Abbas and grew up in Shiraz.

After months of fighting cancer, Saber Rastikerdar died on November 14, 2023, at the age of 36 and was buried in the artist's plot of Razvaniyeh cemetery in Fasa. Before that, he had announced on his personal blog that he had found a pelvic tumor and as a result of a stage IV cancer.
