= Power to Change Trust =

Charitable trust operating in England

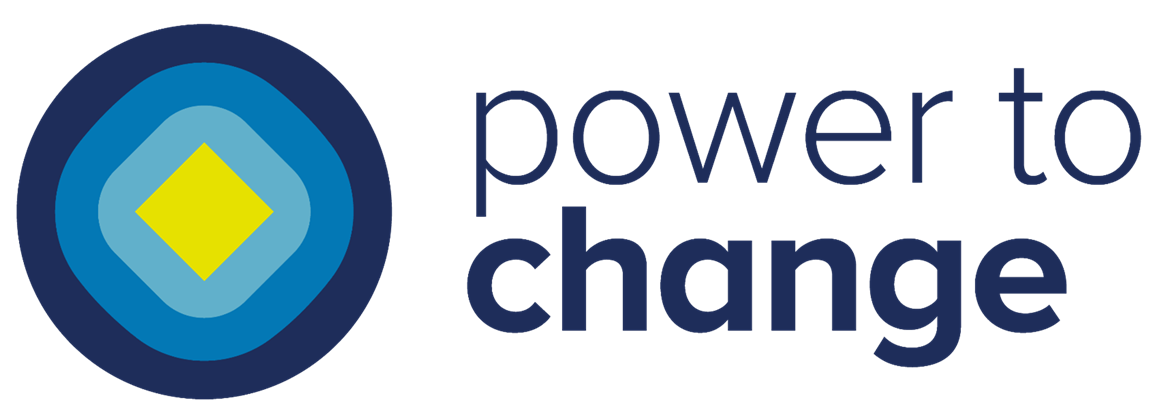
- Founded: 2015
- Type: Charitable Trust
- Registration no.: 1159982
- Location: London, Bristol, Sheffield
- Region served: England
- Key people: Tim Davies-Pugh - Chief Executive
- Website: www.thepowertochange.org.uk

Power to Change is a charitable trust operating in England, created in 2015 with a £150 million endowment from the National Lottery Community Fund (formerly Big Lottery Fund.)

The trust supports community businesses in England.

The trust's ultimate goal is to ‘strengthen communities through community business', which it believes has the power to 'tackle some of society's biggest challenges at a local level' including climate change, digital transformation and social inequalities.

== Operations ==
- The trust ran an initial grants programme (now closed) that awarded £8 million of grant funding to community businesses.
- £2m has been invested into two blended funding pilots, where non-repayable grant funding is used to unlock appropriate repayable finance. These pilots are hoped to release around £6m of investment that community businesses wouldn't be able to access otherwise.
- In March 2016 the trust launched a £1 million match funding pilot with the Community Shares Unit which will be used to boost the investment that community businesses raise through community share offers.
- Applications for its £10 million Community Business Fund will be accepted from April 2016, awarding grants between £50,000- £300,000. Howe
- In partnership with the Department for Communities and Local Government, Power to Change set up a £3.62 million community pub business support programme in March 2016. This will be delivered by the Plunkett Foundation.
- Inception funds for earlier stage community businesses opened in 2016.
- The Power to Change Research Institute was set up with a £7.5 million budget as part of the trust's commitment to building a strong evidence base for the positive impact of community business. It released its first report on the size of the community business market in March 2016.

== Governance ==
The organisation is governed by a board of 11 trustees, chaired by Tony Burton who took over from Stephen Howard in January 2023. Its chief executive is Tim Davies-Pugh. The trust has offices in London, Bristol and Sheffield.
