= Sabre Jet (disambiguation) =

The North American F-86 Sabre is a jet fighter aircraft.

Sabre Jet may also refer to:

- Sabre Jet (film), a 1953 Korean War film
- CAC Sabre, an Australian jet fighter aircraft developed from the North American F-86 Sabre
- Canadair Sabre, a Canadian fighter aircraft developed from the North American F-86 Sabre

== See also ==
- North American F-100 Super Sabre, a jet fighter aircraft
- North American Sabreliner, a mid-size business jet
