= SaBRE =

Section of the UK Ministry of Defence

SaBRE (Supporting Britain's Reservists and Employers) is a government-sponsored organization established in 2002. It was set up "with the belief that if an employer understands the role of Reservists and is aware of the skills they develop, their support for their Reserve Forces employees will be that much greater". It is a section of the Ministry of Defence.
