= SABRE Research UK =

British charity

- Predecessor: Society for Accountability of Animal Studies in Biomedical Research and Education
- Formation: 5 December 2005
- Dissolved: 13 May 2019
- Type: Nonprofit
- VAT ID no.: 1112399
- Purpose: Calling for systematic reviews of animal studies to determine the value of animal research to human health.
- Location: United Kingdom
- Official language: English

SABRE Research UK was a British charity raising awareness of the need to remove bias from the conduct and scientific evaluation of animal research. It addressed issues in systematic reviews of animal studies (published results of laboratory animal experiments). The charity was previously known as the Society for Accountability of Animal Studies in Biomedical Research and Education and was constituted in 2005 in response to disquiet about uninformed opinions about the scientific value of animal studies and dissatisfaction with polarised positions in the debate about animal research. The charity reported that neither the proponents of animal research nor its opponents were able to produce sufficiently sound scientific evidence in support of their opposing cases.

The charity was independent from political parties, animal research advocacy groups, the pharmaceutical industry, animal rights groups or any other vested interests. It did not take a position on the moral, welfare or ethical use of animals in research. Its interests were in the economic costs, the application and relevance of animal research to human health and how the results of animal experiments are analysed, evaluated and interpreted and the resulting data used to inform the design of clinical trials.

== History ==
The formation of the charity followed the publication of an Education and Debate paper in the BMJ in 2004 which expressed concerns about the lack of scientific evidence to support the claims made by animal research advocates. The paper, itself a systematic review, was the first to call for systematic reviews of animal studies. It also called for the prospective registration of all animal research projects licensed by the Home Office. The authors were concerned that animal research is not conducted, analysed and reported (published) as rigorously as clinical research, which has reporting standards such as the CONSORT statement for randomised controlled clinical trials. These measures are considered important as they promote higher standards of research conduct through higher reporting standards.

In 2005 a report was published by the Nuffield Council on Bioethics which called for systematic reviews and meta-analyses to be carried out in order to "evaluate more fully the predictability and transferability of animal models". The report concluded that "At present, there is a relatively limited number of useful systematic reviews and meta-reviews that address the question of the scientific validity of animal experiments and tests." The report recommended that the programme be funded by the Home Office in collaboration "with major funders of research such as the Wellcome Trust, the MRC, the Biotechnology and Biological Sciences Research Council (BBSRC), animal protection groups and industry associations such as the ABPI".

A larger study was published in the BMJ in 2007 which drew attention to a lack of communication between animal researchers and clinical researchers and "identified a gap in knowledge about the usefulness of the volume of animal studies that look at biological mechanisms of disease" and that "more systematic reviews are needed for a quantitative appraisal of the concordance between animal and clinical trials." The review reiterated earlier calls for the Home Office to undertake prospective registration of animal studies. The authors had found that the Home Office showed a lack of interest in the quality of record-keeping needed for preparing systematic reviews.

== SABRE's priorities for research involving animals ==
- Implementation of the 10Rs+ Strategy to include a full programme of Systematic reviews of existing animal studies before funding any new animal research. http://bmcmedethics.biomedcentral.com/articles/10.1186/s12910-015-0043-7
- Prospective registration of animal studies (to be maintained by the Home Office) with adequate details recorded to inform subsequent systematic reviews.
- Adoption and implementation of the new guidelines (The ARRIVE Guidelines) on reporting animal research, by authors, journal editors, peer reviewers, and funding bodies.
- A large-scale programme of systematic reviews of existing animal studies (the published results of laboratory animal experiments) to be conducted to assess and monitor the value of animal research to the promotion of human health.
