= Saber Radar =

Brazilian army project to develop air defense radar

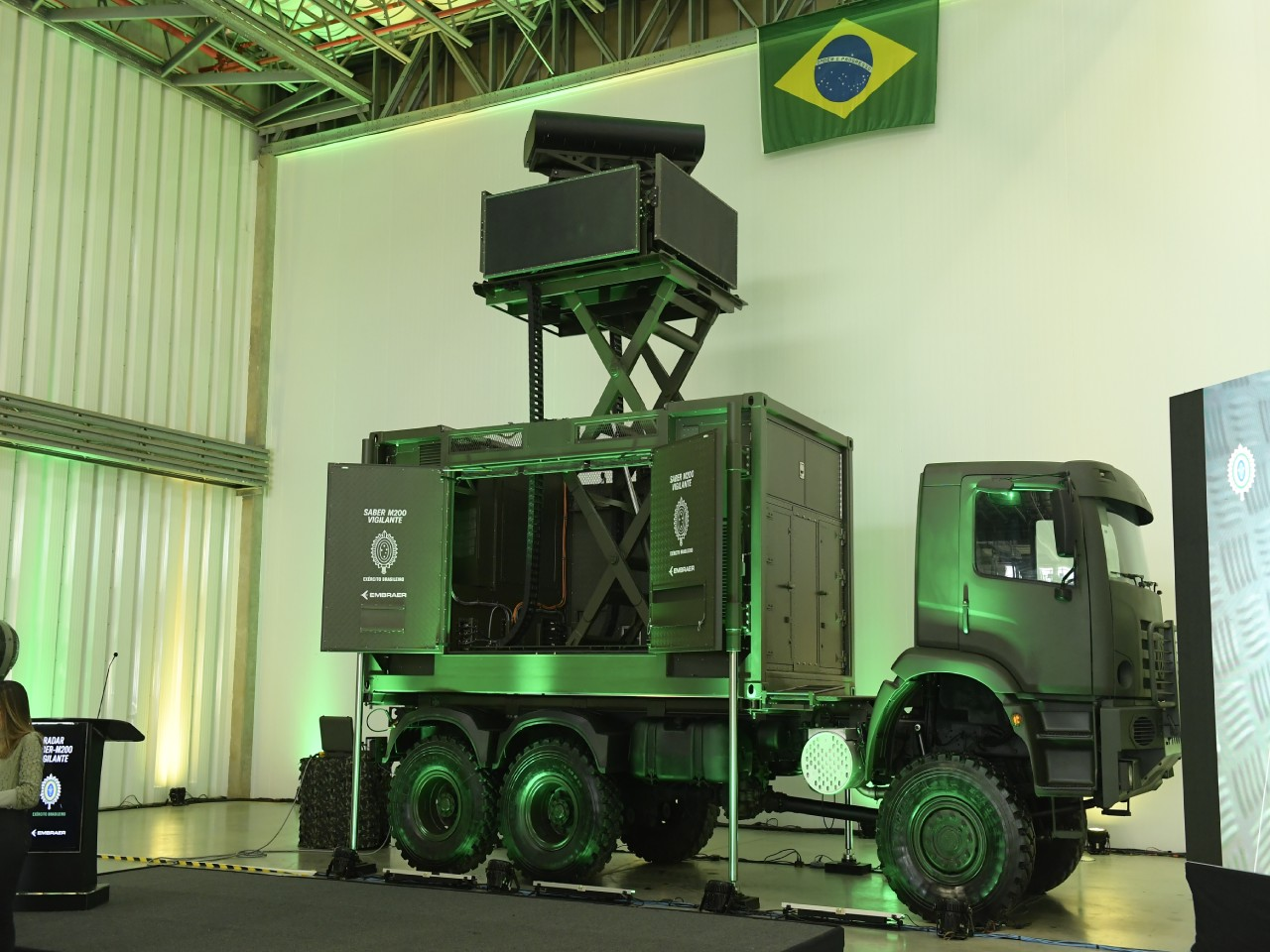
- Country of origin: Brazil
- Introduced: 2010
- No. built: 40
- Type: 3D
- Frequency: S band
- Range: 60km ~ 400km
- Altitude: 5000m ~ 16000m

The SABER Radar is a project of the Brazilian Army, with the objective of developing 100% Brazilian technology air defense radars. They are being developed by CTEx (Army Technology Center) and produced by BRADAR, a Brazilian company part of Embraer Defense and Security group, with funds from the Ministry of Science and Technology. The tracking system can track both air and ground targets and has a range of up to 60 kilometers and up to 5,000 meters altitude. The radar system is unique in that it can be integrated into weapon systems or missile-based anti-aircraft guns.

== Radar ==
The SABER (Tracking System Based on aerial targets Radio Frequency Emission) radar was developed by the Brazilian Army aiming its operational employment in both military and civilian applications. The SABER is a 3D radar that tracks up to 40 targets simultaneously, classifying them as friend or foe, distinguishing between fixed-wing and rotary-wing aircraft. It performs the detection of aerial targets for antiaircraft defenses, providing data for the entire cycle from detection to engagement of air targets. The SABER radar performs two tasks:

- Surveillance: To maintain control centers air defense with the updated information vector, friends and hostile, positioned and correlated to measures of coordination and airspace control, and
- The quest: To transmit data of threats for anti-aircraft weapons systems, shortening the reaction time and ensuring the successful engagement of air targets.

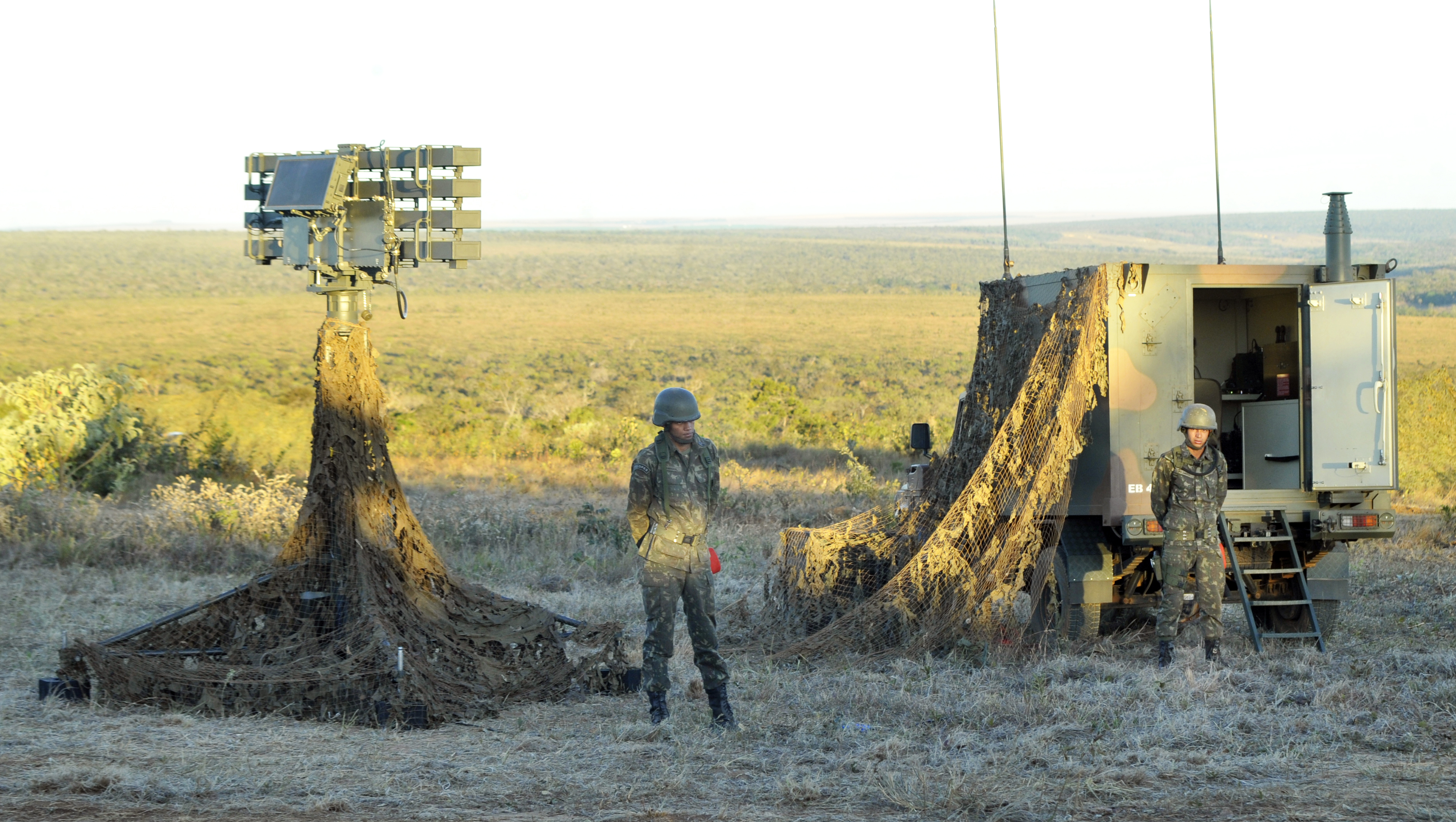

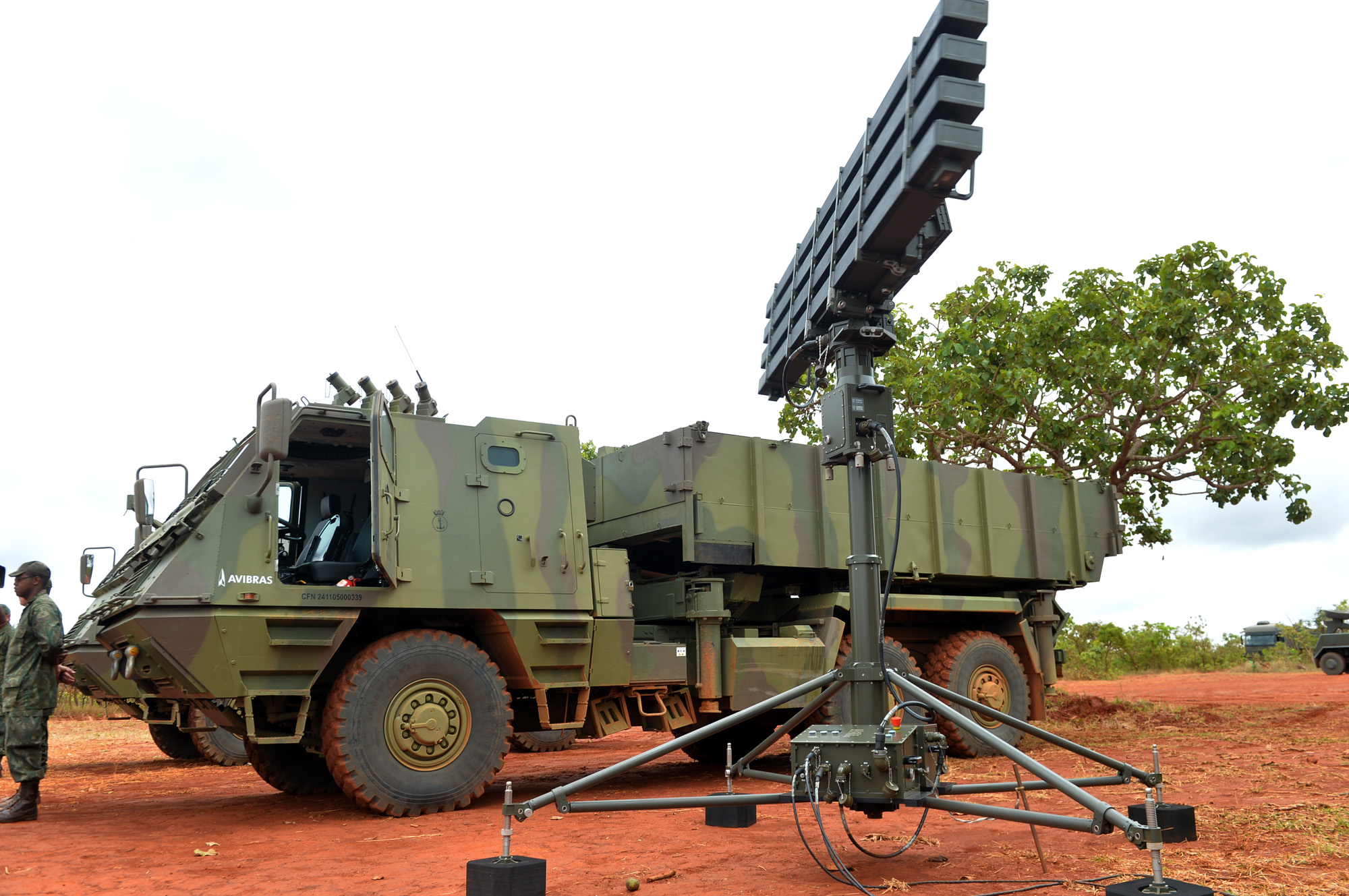

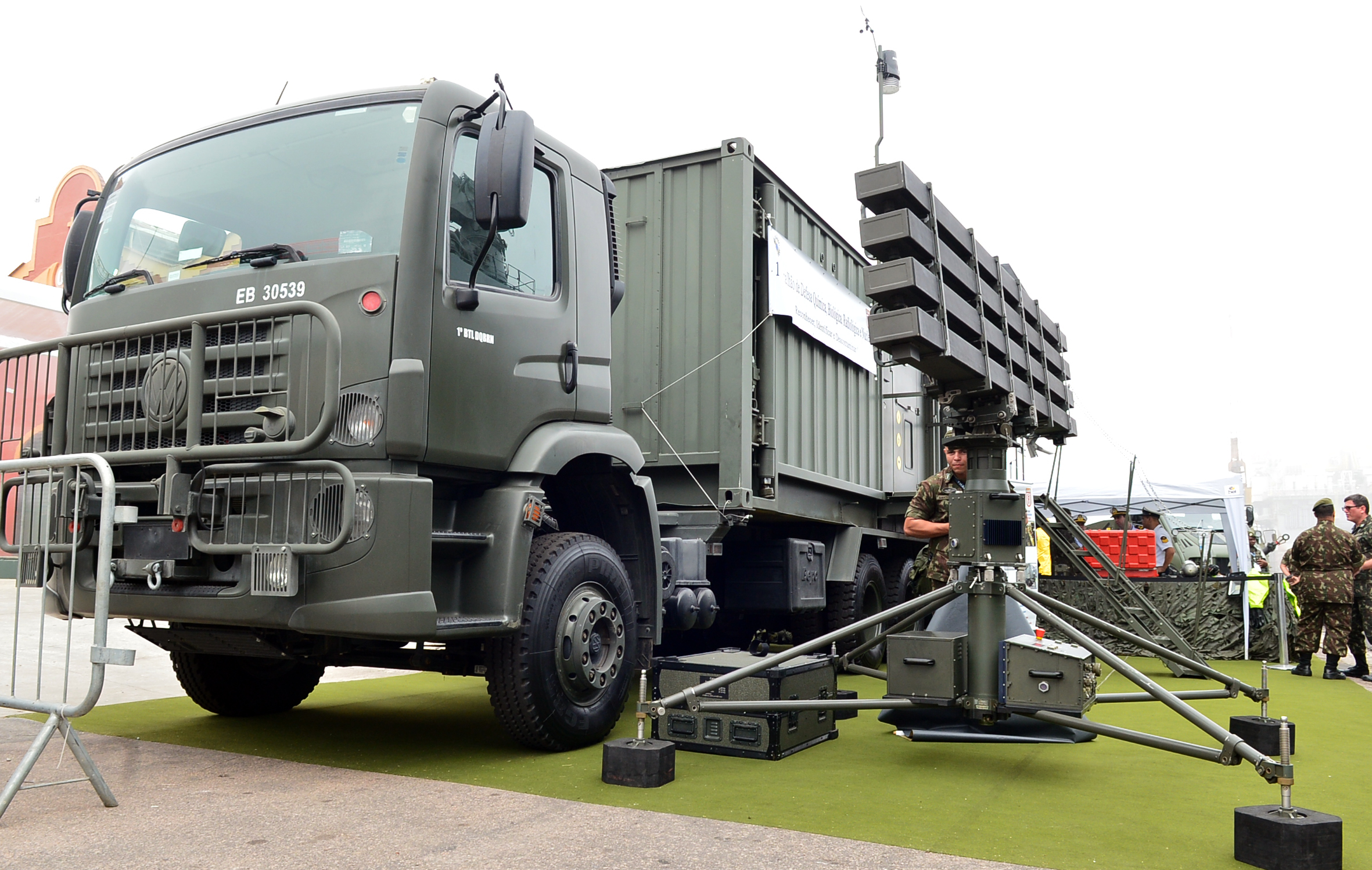

== Versions ==
- SENTIR M20 - Ground radar with range up to 25 km.
- SABER M60 - The first operational Saber series radar. With a range of 75 km, weight of 200 kg, and the ability of tracking up to 40 targets, it has the same functions as large airport radar units. It can also work in environments such as dense jungles.
- SABER S60 - The secondary radar (IFF) with range up to 90 km of the Saber M60.
- SABER M200 Vigilante - S-Band radar with fully electronic azimuth sweep (active phased array) with range to 200 km In container form it can be transported or operated in 6x6 trucks.
- SABER M200 Multimissão - A larger and heavier version will be a multi-mission AESA Radar S-Band capable of guiding mid-range air defense systems within a radius of 400 km~500 km In container form it can be transported or operated in 8x8 trucks.
- SABER S200R - The secondary radar (IFF) with range up to 400 km.

== Users ==
- Brazil
- Brazilian Army - 33
- Brazilian Air Force - 06
- Brazilian Marine Corps - 01
- Mauritania
- Mauritania Islamic Air Force - Unknown
