= Passage of Curupayty (1868) =

2nd Passage of Curupayty
- Part of the Humaitá campaign
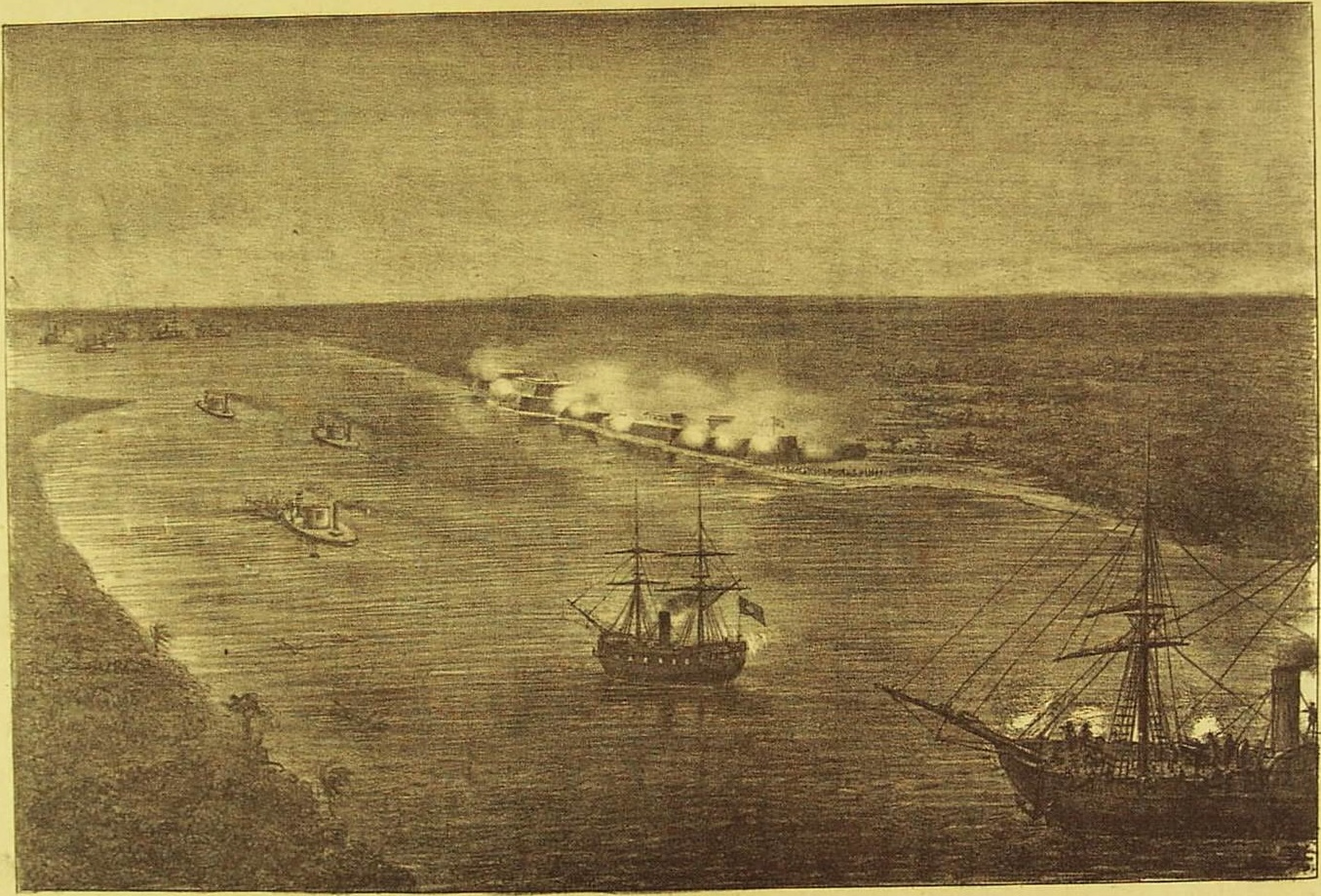
- 2nd Passage of Curupayty, A Vida Fluminense, 1868
Date	13 February 1868
Location	Curupayty Fort, Paraguay River, Paraguay
Result	Brazilian victory

Belligerents
Empire of Brazil	Paraguay

Commanders and leaders
Delfim Carlos de Carvalho	Francisco Solano López

Strength
3 monitors 6 wooden steamships	Curupayty Fort with 30 cannons

Casualties and losses
Unknown	Unknown

The second passage of Curupayty was a naval operation carried out by the Imperial Brazilian Navy in the Paraguayan War on 13 February 1868, which aimed to force, once again, the passage of the Curupayty Fort. This time the passage was carried out by the new Brazilian monitors Alagoas, Pará and Rio Grande, in addition to some other wooden ships. The fleet faced thirty artillery pieces for an hour.

== The action ==
The first passage of the fort took place on 15 August 1867 by ten ironclads of the imperial fleet. The fortress itself would only be abandoned on 23 March 1868, so the Paraguayans were still stationed there and any attempt to overtake it would also be under artillery fire. The Brazilian government had already made the decision to force the passage of the fortress of Humaitá, which effectively happened six days later on 19 February 1868, and for this feat it was necessary to force the passage of Curupayty once again, since the new flotilla would have to join the other fleet trapped between the two fortresses. Between December 1867 and February 1868, the new Brazilian monitors of the Pará-class arrived in the front: the Alagoas, under the command of 1st lieutenant Cordovil Maurity; Pará, commanded by 1st lieutenant Custódio de Melo and Rio Grande, under the command of 1st lieutenant Antônio Joaquim. The fleet consisted of these three monitors and six other wooden ships. The fortress was defended by around 30 artillery pieces and a large garrison. The Baron of Inhaúma entrusted the mission to captain of sea and war Delfim Carlos de Carvalho, who was later granted the title of Baron of Passagem after the passage of Humaitá.

On the 12th of February at 20:30 the small fleet started moving towards the enemy fort. However, due to a mechanical failure and a collision between Alagoas and Ipiranga that brought down the funnel onto its deck, the passage attempt was halted. After repairs, on the night of the 13 February the second passage of Curupayty took place. The wooden ships responded to fire from the Paraguayan garrison, with Alagoas and Pará advancing shortly thereafter at 21:30. The passage of the ships took about an hour, with the Rio Grande being the last ship to join the fleet upstream.

== Gallery ==
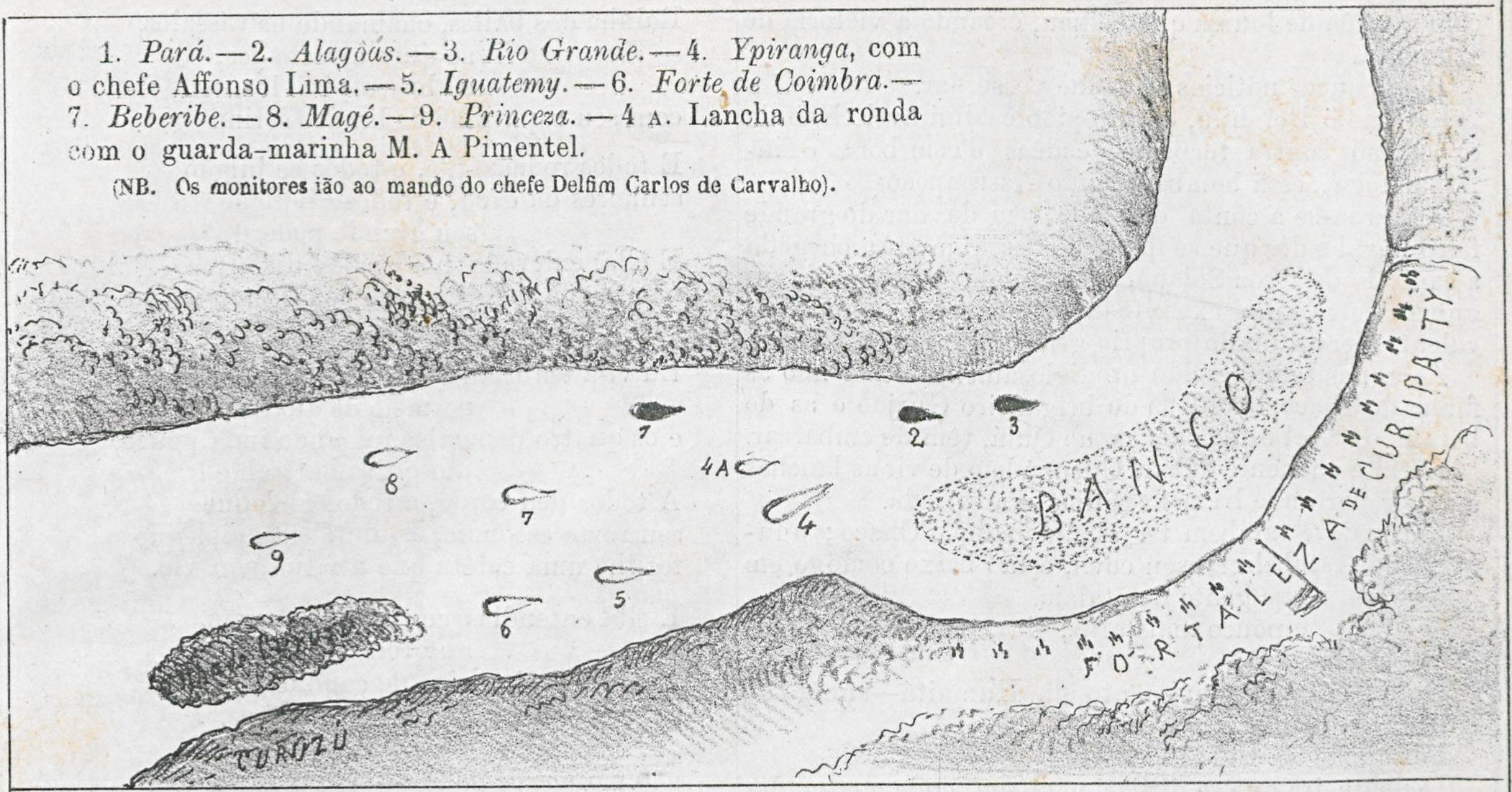
Passage of the monitors against the batteries of Curupayty on the night of 13 February 1868 (Semana Illustrada, 1868)
