= Joaquim Antônio Cordovil Maurity =

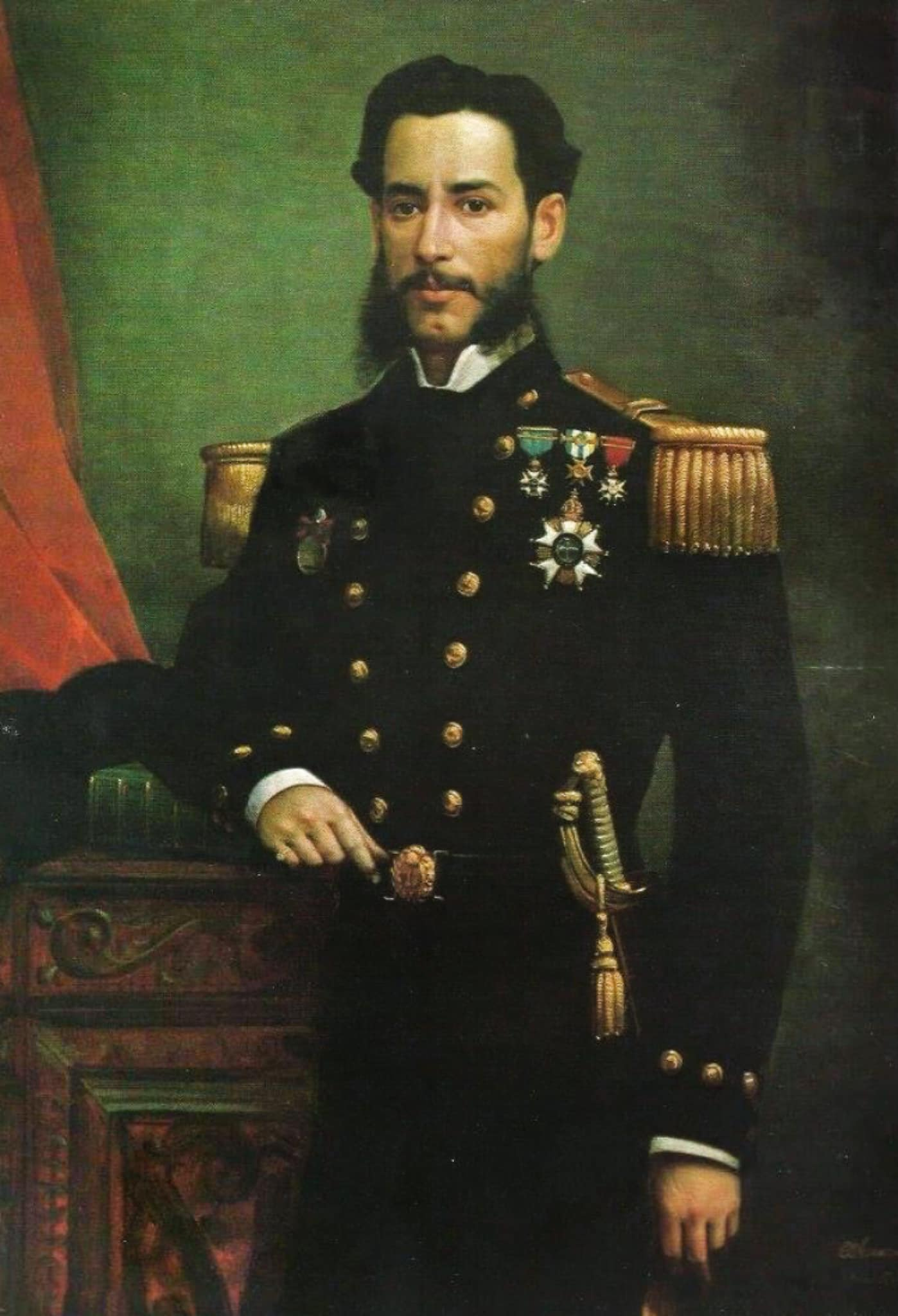
- Born: 13 January 1844; Rio de Janeiro, Neutral Municipality, Empire of Brazil
- Died: 6 January 1915 (aged 70); Rio de Janeiro, Rio de Janeiro, Brazil
- Military career
- Allegiance: Empire of Brazil
- Branch: Imperial Brazilian Navy
- Rank: Admiral
- Commands: Monitor Alagoas
- Conflicts: Paraguayan War

Joaquim Antônio Cordovil Maurity (13 January 1844 – 6 January 1915) was a Brazilian admiral and a decorated hero of the Paraguayan War.

== Biography ==
One of the six children of Portuguese Jacob Maria Maurity and his wife Joaquina Eulália Cordovil de Siqueira e Melo, a descendant of the clan of benefactors of the royal farm during the Colonial era, whose name was given to the homonymous neighborhood in Rio de Janeiro, Maurity was born in Rio de Janeiro on 13 January 1844.

Maurity joined the Naval Academy in 1860 after graduating from Pedro II School. He was subsequently promoted to midshipman in 1862; and second lieutenant in 1864, when the Paraguayan War broke out.

He was the commander of the monitor Alagoas in the Passage of Humaitá, during the Paraguayan War. He distinguished himself in the episode because, ignoring orders, he advanced alone, during at least three attempts, under intense artillery fire from the fortress and succeeding.

Regarding Maurity's success at the time of the passage of Humaitá, the Viscount of Taunay later recorded, in his return to the theater of war as secretary of the Count of Eu, after withdrawing from Laguna: "my objective was glory, glory in every sense, military, literary!... I thought, then, that I could climb, climb very high, becoming known throughout Brazil, thus a kind of Maurity, whose name was so acclaimed since the famous feat of passing through the batteries of Humaitá, on 18 January 1868" and that "It was, in fact, difficult to enjoy more popularity than this naval officer. [...] At that time, however, there was only talk of Maurity, and everywhere cities on the coast and inland acclaimed and gave him brilliant and continuous parties".

Maurity died on 6 January 1915, with the rank of admiral.

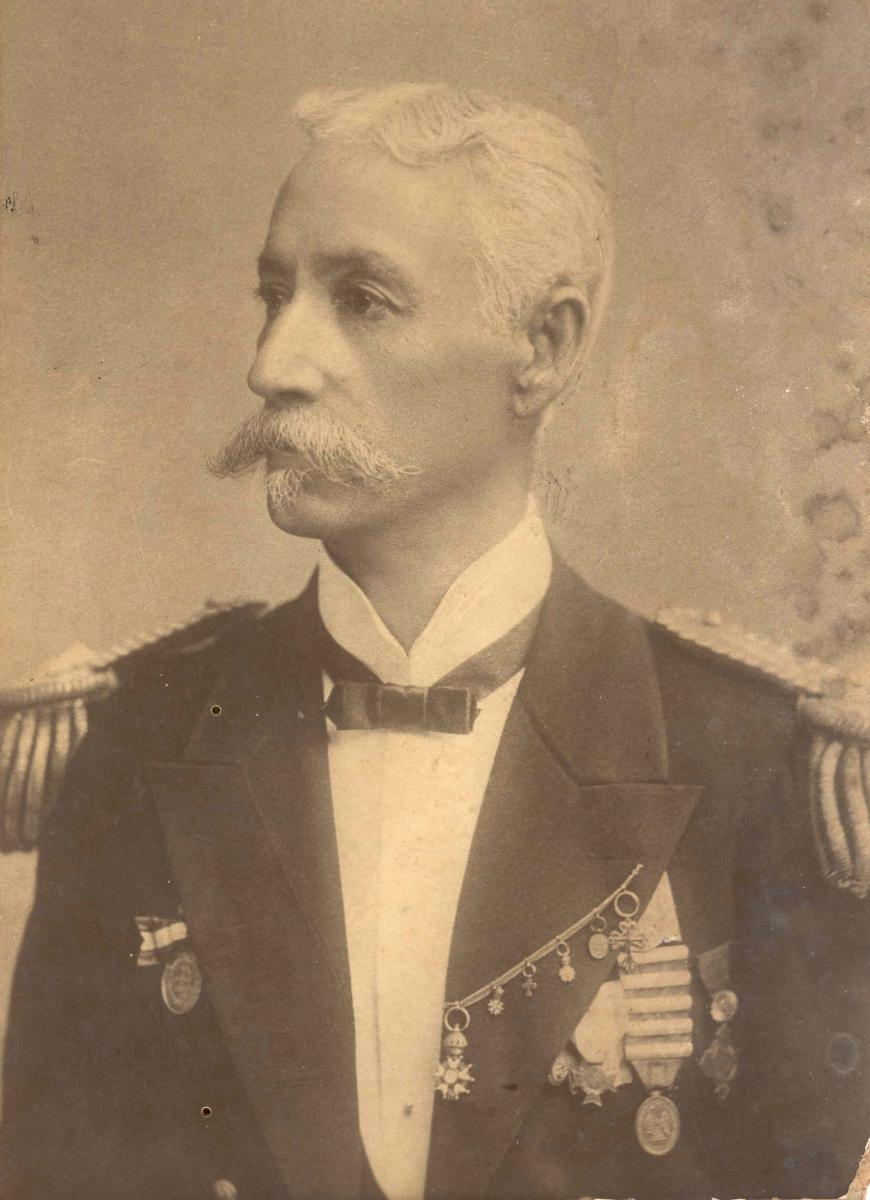
Admiral Maurity in his old age
