= Delfim Carlos de Carvalho, Baron of Passagem =

Brazilian military personnel

Baron of Passagem
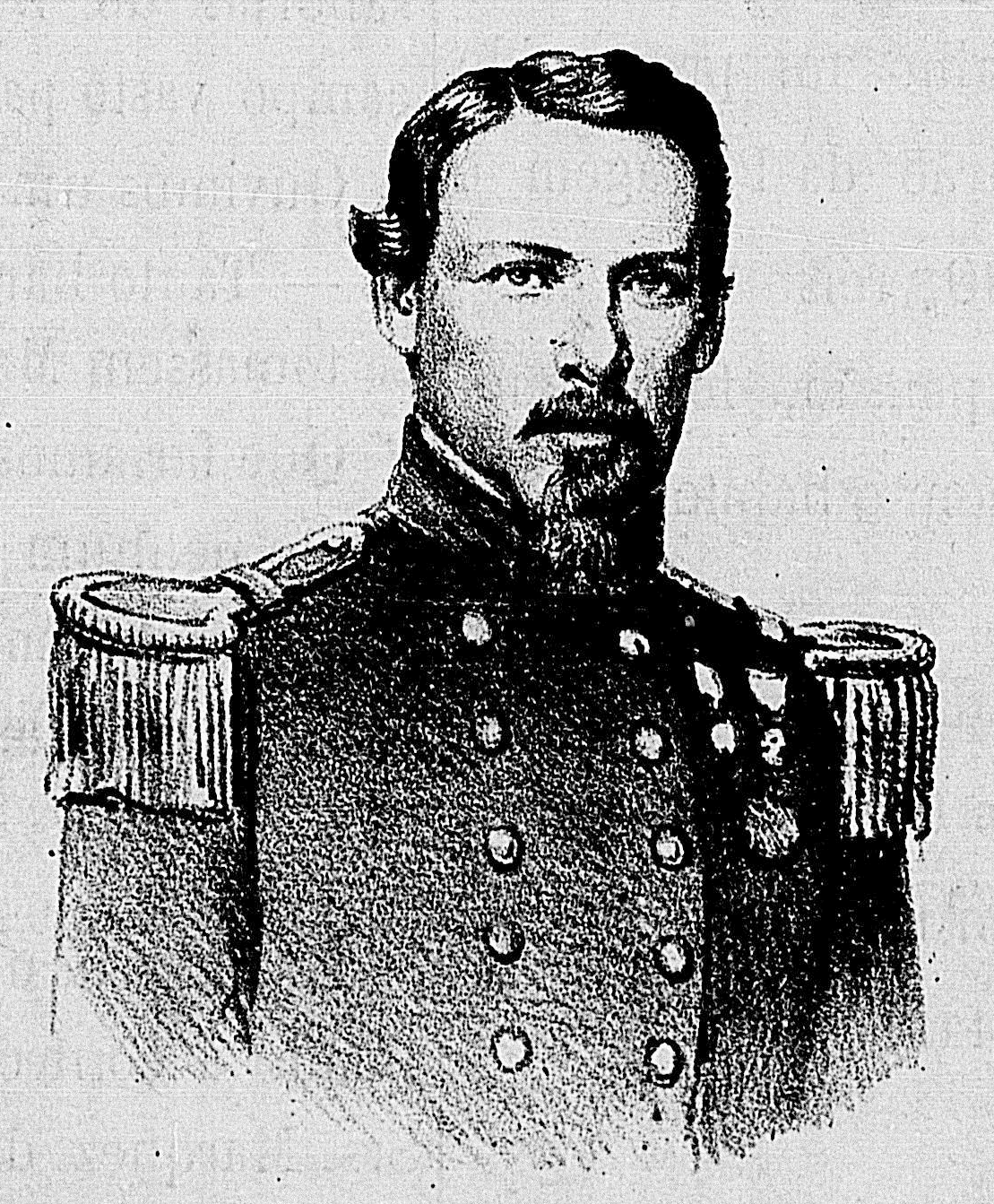
- The Baron of Passagem, lithography by Angelo Agostini, 1868
- Born: 13 April 1825; Rio de Janeiro, Empire of Brazil
- Died: 19 May 1896 (aged 71); Rio de Janeiro, Brazil
- Military career
- Allegiance: Empire of Brazil
- Branch: Imperial Brazilian Navy
- Conflicts: Paraguayan War

Delfim Carlos de Carvalho (13 April 1825 – 19 May 1896), the Baron of Passagem, was a Brazilian naval officer who fought in the Paraguayan War. He was a Chief of Division at the Battle of Riachuelo. He commanded the squadron that effected the Passage of Humaitá on 19 February 1868. He was also a member of the Supreme Military Justice in 1891.
