= Passage of Humaitá =

Operation in the Paraguayan War

Coordinates: 27°04′S 58°31′W

- Part of the Siege of Humaitá
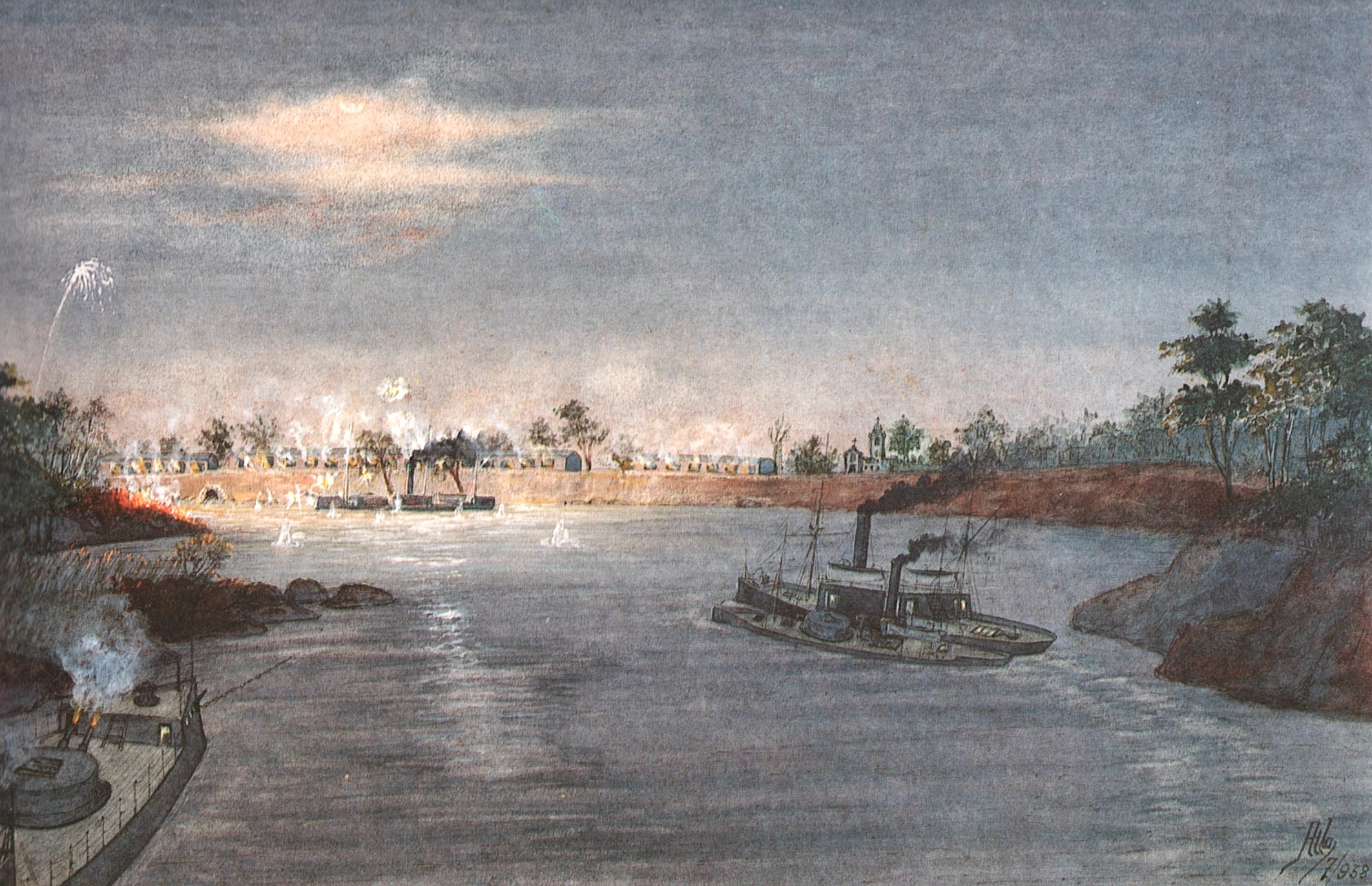
- The Passage of Humaitá depicted by Brazilian admiral and watercolourist Trajano Augusto de Carvalho (1876–1942)
| Date | 19 February 1868 |
| Location | Paraguay River, Humaitá |
| Result | Brazilian victory |

Belligerents
| Paraguay | Empire of Brazil |

Commanders and leaders
| Paulino Alén | Delfim de Carvalho |

Strength
| Fortress of Humaitá (8 river batteries; unknown contact mines) | 3 coastal battleships 3 river monitors |

Casualties and losses
| Unknown (+150 killed or wounded in land diversionary attack) | 10 wounded (+1,200 killed or wounded in land diversionary attack) |

The Passage of Humaitá (Portuguese: Passagem de Humaitá) was an operation of riverine warfare during the Paraguayan War − the most lethal in South American history − in which a force of six Imperial Brazilian Navy armoured vessels was ordered to dash past under the guns of the Paraguayan fortress of Humaitá. Some competent neutral observers had considered that the feat was very nearly impossible.

The purpose of the exercise was to stop the Paraguayans resupplying the fortress by river, and to provide the Empire of Brazil and its Allies with a much-needed propaganda victory. The attempt took place on 19 February 1868 and was successful – the attackers had hit upon the fortress' weakness. It restored the reputation of the Brazilian navy and the Brazilian Empire's financial credit, and caused the Paraguayans to evacuate their capital Asunción. Some authors have considered that it was the turning point or culminating event of the war. The fortress, by then fully surrounded by Allied forces on land or blockaded by water, was captured on 25 July 1868.

== Historical background ==
The Fortress of Humaitá was a defensive system on a bend in the River Paraguay, not far from its mouth. Long considered to be almost impregnable, it prevented enemy shipping ascending the river and hence invading the Republic of Paraguay. There may have been other routes by which the country could have been invaded, but they were considered more difficult still. From the main article on the Fortress of Humaitá it appears that Marshal-President López of Paraguay may have calculated that, because the fortress could not be bypassed except at ruinous expense, he could risk making war on the much more populous Brazil and Argentina.

The Paraguayan War (also known as the War of the Triple Alliance) of 1864–1870 was the most lethal in South American history, and − in terms of its relative mortality − very possibly the worst in modern history, anywhere. It actually commenced when López seized the Brazilian ship Marques de Olinda on her routine voyage up the River Paraguay to the Brazilian province of Mato Grosso, then sent military forces to invade the province itself. It developed further when he seized Argentine naval vessels moored in the port of Corrientes, north east Argentina. Thereafter López sent two further armies, one to invade the Argentine province of Corrientes along the River Paraná and the other to invade the Brazilian province of Rio Grande do Sul along the River Uruguay. On 1 May 1865 Brazil, Argentina and Uruguay signed the Treaty of the Triple Alliance by which they would not negotiate peace with Paraguay until the government of López had been deposed.

Further, for Brazil the river was the only practicable route to its interior province of Mato Grosso, which had been invaded by the forces of López earlier in the War. The war aims of the Allies (Brazil, Argentina and Uruguay) explicitly included the capture and destruction of Humaitá, and it was the prime military objective of the Allied high command.

== The Allies' strategic problem ==
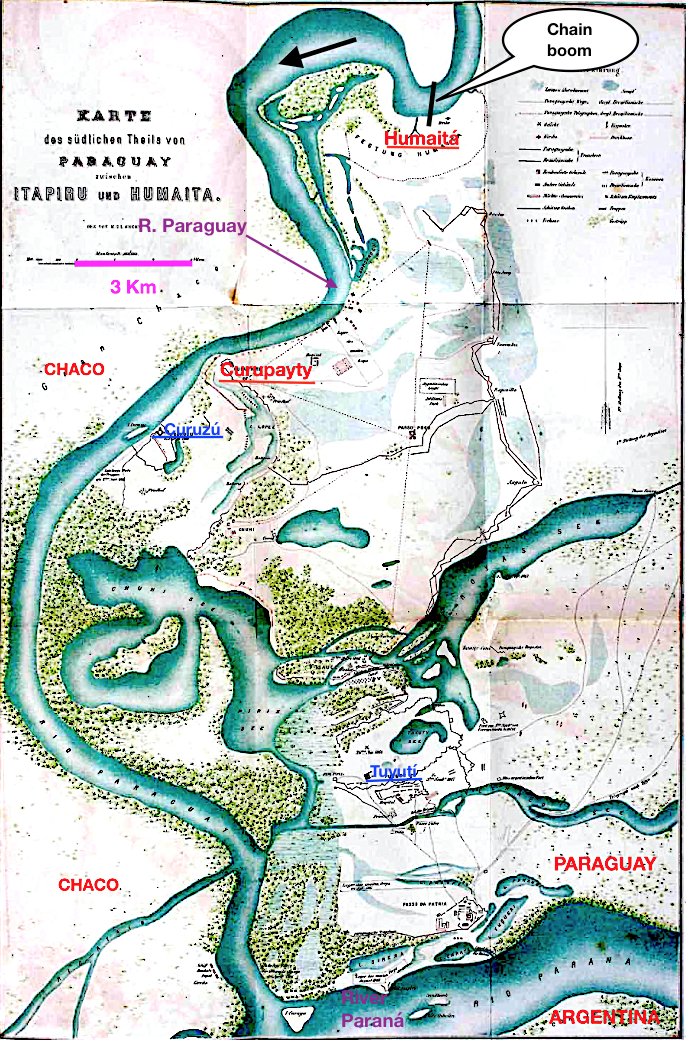
Humaitá in context. The small area where the Allies were bogged down for two and a half years in the wetlands of southwestern Paraguay. Note the scale on the map. However the Allies had captured the forward base of Curuzú in September 1866 (Base map in Schneider, 1872)

It took the Allies about a year to defeat the invading Paraguayan forces in the Brazilian province of Rio Grande do Sul and expel them from Argentina. According to their treaty they now had to neutralise Humaitá and depose López. In April 1866 the Allies crossed the River Paraná into southwestern Paraguay, occupying a small strip of territory. Their next strategic problem was how to proceed up the River Paraguay, getting past the Fortress of Humaitá.

Briefly, the fortress of Humaitá was built on a sharp concave bend in the river and comprised more than a mile of heavy artillery batteries atop a low cliff. The channel was only 200 yards wide, and ran within easy range of the batteries; a heavy chain boom could be raised to block the navigation and detain the shipping under the guns. 'Torpedoes' (improvised contact naval mines) could be released or anchored in the stream. On its landward side the fortress was protected either by impassable terrain or by 8 miles of trenches with 120 heavy guns and a garrison of 18,000 men. An attempt to capture one of its outworks by frontal attack failed disastrously at the Battle of Curupayty (22 September 1866); another frontal attack was out of the question.

From a naval perspective the heavy guns of the fortress might – in principle – be bypassed by the latest ironclads (armoured vessels), provided the chain boom could be cut and any 'torpedoes' avoided. But those vessels could not have operated ahead of their forward bases for long, because they would need to be resupplied with fuel, ammunition and provisions. Furthermore, the Brazilian navy command claimed there was no room inside the ironclads for the conveyance of troops; the wooden transport vessels could not have accompanied them.

The land operation in which the Allied land forces did succeed in capturing the Humaitá complex, known as the Siege of Humaitá, is outside the scope of this Article. However, to starve out Humaitá it was necessary to stop the Paraguayans resupplying it by river. But, in order to do that, it was necessary to obtain command of the river, in other words, to steam past Humaitá.

== Difficulties facing the Allies ==
=== 1. The home front ===
By the end of 1867 the Allies were badly in need of a propaganda victory. The war had cost them a lot of men and money; though they still had superior manpower yet they were stuck in the small area of southwestern Paraguay shown in the map. The disaster of Curupayty had sunk their morale and led to a year's inactivity. And it had fostered an already strong anti-war faction in Argentina. Armed revolutions had broken out in that country – especially in the Andean provinces – demanding peace with Paraguay. It had got to the point that the Allied commander-in-chief General Bartolomé Mitre had temporarily quit Paraguay with 4,000 Argentine troops in order to put down the revolts, leaving the Brazilian General the Marquis of Caxias in charge.

Brazil financed its warlike operations partly by borrowing in the financial markets especially the City of London, and advanced money to Argentina and Uruguay. The lack of progress in the war was affecting its financial credit.

In June 1867 Caxias wrote to a colleague:

My friend, let us see if we can conclude this cursed war which has ruined our country, and whose duration shames us.

=== 2. Extended lines of communication ===
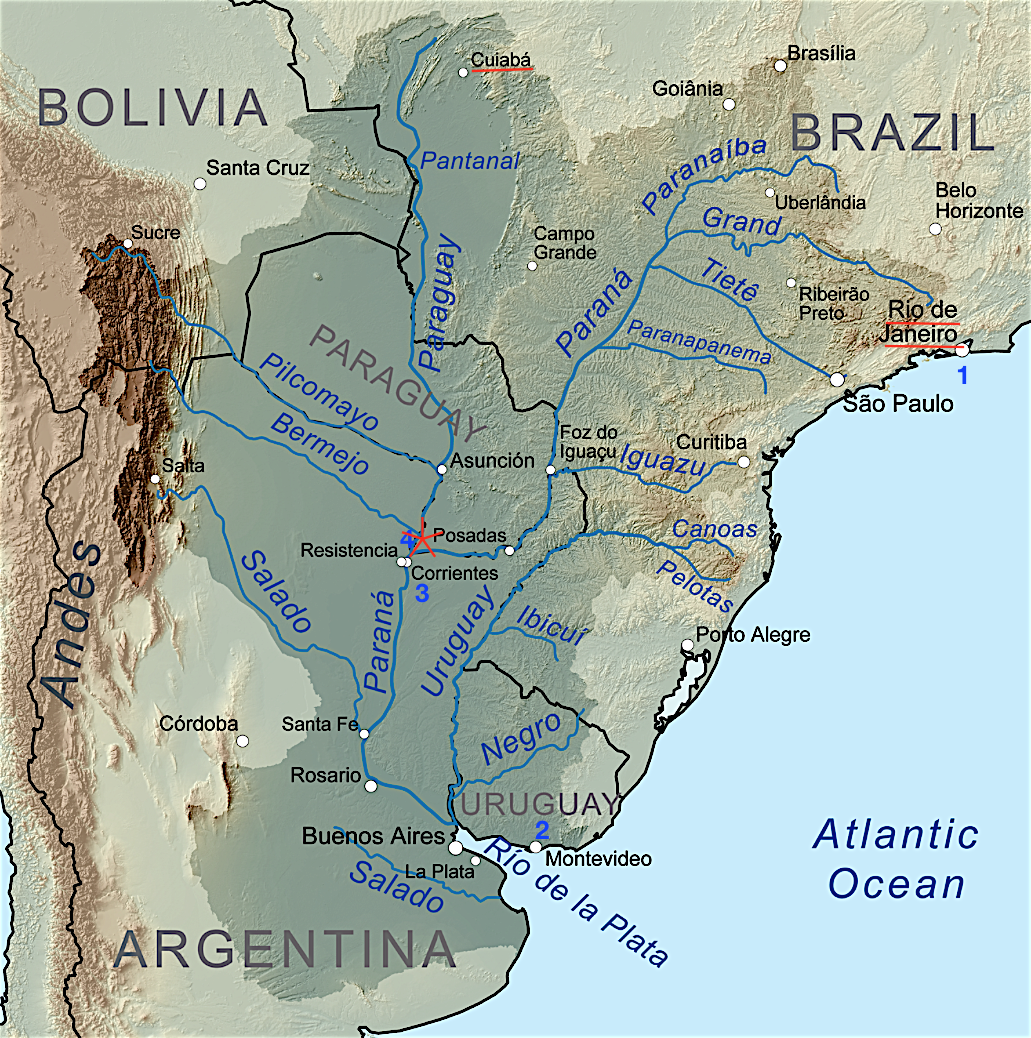
Brazil's long supply lines. Every round of ammunition had to be transported by sea from Rio de Janeiro 1 to Montevideo, Uruguay 2 then upriver to Corrientes, NE Argentina 3 and thence to the naval base 4 on the River Paraguay − a sailing distance of nearly 3,300 km.

Lengthy lines of communication vastly increased the difficulty and cost of the war for Brazil. According to the American envoy to Paraguay, López had banked on that fact when deciding to make war on the Brazilian Empire in the first place.

Steam vessels were the only practicable means of communication. Thus in Brazil the overland journey from São Paulo to Mato Grosso took two and a half months by fast mule; by steamship, although the detour south through the River Plate and up through the River Paraguay was vast, it could be done in little over a fortnight. Tension over this route had been one of the causes of the Paraguayan war.

Ammunition or other stores shipped from Rio de Janeiro, Brazil to the naval arsenal at Isla del Cerrito, near the mouth of the river Paraguay, had to travel an extensive water route.

| Leg | Water route | Nautical miles | Kilometres |
|---|---|---|---|
| Rio de Janeiro (Brazil) to Montevideo (Uruguay) | South Atlantic Ocean | 1099 | 2036 |
| Montevideo (Uruguay) to Corrientes (NE Argentina) | River Plate – Paraná delta – River Paraná | 651 | 1206 |
| Corrientes (NE Argentina) to vicinity of Humaitá (Paraguay) | River Paraná – River Paraguay | 14 | 26 |

Vessels requiring to be repaired could not be sent down to Buenos Aires for lack of facilities, and Rio de Janeiro was too far. Isla del Cerrito ("island of the hillock") was and is a small island at the confluence of the Paraná and Paraguay rivers. There the navy established a machine shop employing 20 men; a boatyard manned by 50 carpenters, etc; a coal bunker; a gunpowder mill; a naval hospital; and even a church. Good naval timber required for repairs was harvested locally.

Because the river was blocked at Humaitá, stores required further north had to go by oxcart convoys on a route flanking Humaitá to the east. Those convoys were the object of repeated Paraguayan ambushes.

=== 3. Inherent difficulty in effecting the naval passage of Humaitá ===
Although some foreign observers were critical of the Brazilian navy's lack of zeal and implied that it should have forced the passage long ago, those observers were not naval men. One who was, Commander Kennedy of the Royal Navy, wrote that there were real difficulties, which he identified as these:

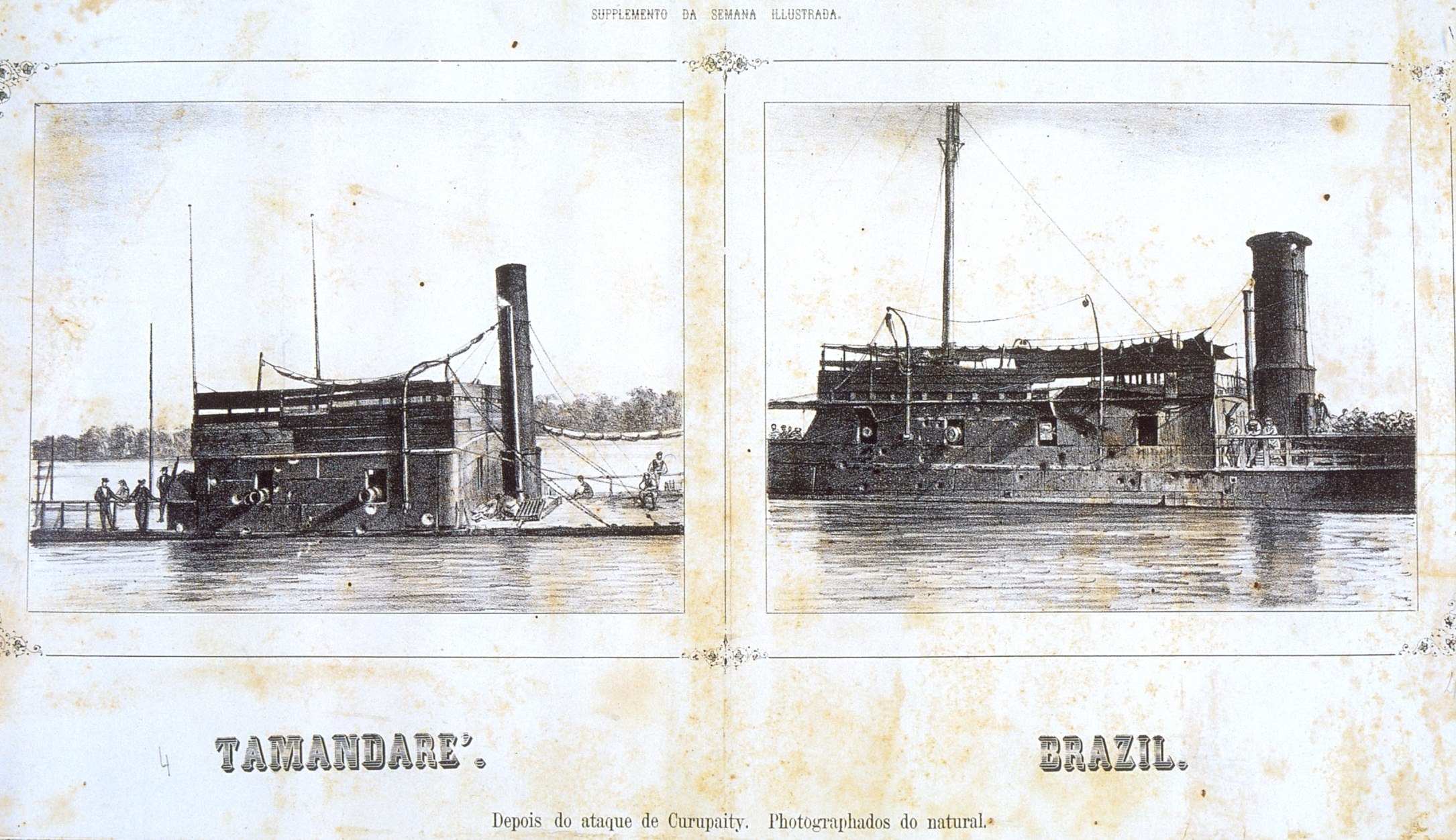
Damage that could be done to ironclads. Tamandaré (left) and Brasil (right) damaged after the earlier attack on Curuzú, a fort much less powerful than Curupayty or Humaitá.

1. The river approach to Humaitá – which included the heavily armed preliminary fortifications at Curupayty – was shallow, narrow, and uncharted.
2. It lent itself to the release of "torpedoes" (improvised contact naval mines).
3. It was too shallow for the heaviest ironclad vessels, except during the river's seasonal rise. The seasonal difference between high and low water could be as much as 3 fathoms (18 ft; 5.5 m).
4. But if these vessels did proceed at high water, they might be grounded, or trapped (neither able to advance or retreat), when the waters fell again.

Commander Kennedy's evaluation:

It is difficult to conceive a more formidable obstacle to an advancing squadron than this small portion of the river between Tres Bocas and Humaitá.

Further, although ironclad vessels were not supposed to be sunk by river batteries of the type possessed by Paraguay, they could be badly damaged. Cannonballs sometimes did penetrate the hull by going through a porthole or gunport. When this happened the shot could fracture or ricochet around inside the casemate producing appalling carnage. And even though most shots did not get inside the hull their force could start the bolts of the iron plating, or produce combat wounds by splintering the wooden backing. For inexperienced seamen inside these vessels the effect could be terrifying.

In any case it would have been necessary, somehow, to cut or evade the chain boom, or else be detained under the Paraguayan artillery indefinitely.

According to the English-language Buenos Ayres Standard

Experienced American and English and French naval officers, who had seen Humaitá, inspected the position, and gone through the batteries, all unanimously agreed on its extreme strength.

=== 4. Dissension amongst the commands ===
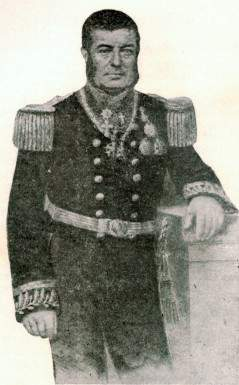
Joaquim José Inácio, ill and described as "a ghost of an admiral", thought the operation was impossible.

The capture of Humaitá was an early example in modern warfare of combined operations, requiring cooperation between land and naval forces but as will now be described there were serious problems.

Argentina and Brazil were traditional enemies. The alliance between them was that of "dog and cat", only brought about when López declared war on them both; it was fraught with mistrust and veiled antagonism. For political reasons the Argentine General Bartolomé Mitre was nominally commander-in-chief, but this went down badly in Brazil whose land forces were much larger; in reality Mitre had to seek consensus with the Brazilian and Uruguayan commands.

Further, the Treaty of the Triple Alliance had stipulated that the naval forces (to all intents and purposes the Brazilian navy, for the Argentine naval forces were small) were to be "under the immediate command" of the Brazilian admiral; and the Brazilian government made it plain that the navy was not taking orders from Mitre.

During the war the Brazilian navy had been criticised for its inertia. It was the modern ironclad vessels of the Brazilian navy that had stood by and allowed the retiring Paraguayan army to escape across the River Paraná on rafts – together with 100,000 head of rustled cattle – without doing anything to stop them. Those same vessels had been defied by two Paraguayan chatas (flat-bottomed, towable barges mounting a single gun). Although the Brazilian naval command protested that the shallow river waters enjoined caution, the Brazilian soldiery and the Emperor Pedro II were disgusted. As a result, the Brazilian Admiral Tamandaré had been relieved of his command and Joaquim José Inácio (1808–1869) had taken over his functions on 2 December 1866.

The naval command was thoroughly distrusted by General Mitre and the distrust was mutual, for the Brazilian commands, military and naval, suspected the Argentines would be only too pleased if the Brazilian navy was destroyed in the war, since it would weaken Brazilian power in the River Plate region. The more Mitre asked the navy to be bold, the more they suspected him.

In practice Mitre never attempted to give direct orders to the Brazilian navy, instead seeking to persuade it through the senior Brazilian land commander.

=== 5. Ageing naval command ===
The new admiral Inácio had had a distinguished and brave fighting career in the days of the blue-water sailing navy. But he had not been to sea for years, pursuing a career as a bureaucrat and then a politician. In Paraguay Inácio became unwell, a prematurely old man, "a ghost of an admiral", as the modern Brazilian historian Francisco Doratioto put it.

According to Artur Silveira da Mota, commander of the ironclad Barroso (who was a full naval captain by the age of 26, and later in life given the rank of admiral and made Baron of Jaceguai) "most of the senior naval command showed themselves to be incompetent for war service, whether for advancing years or for being too long in sedentary jobs", an assertion with which Doratioto was inclined to agree.

== Difficulties facing Paraguay ==
Paraguay was fighting on her home territory; her artillerymen were good; she could cast large guns at her foundries at Asunción and Ibicuy; and foreign observers − including the Allies − were unanimous that her men were superbly brave fighters. However early in the war she had been cut off from the outside world by the Brazilian naval blockade and had to make do with the resources within the country.

=== No armoured vessels ===
In particular, she did not possess a single ironclad vessel. She had placed orders for ironclads at British and French shipyards, but López had attacked Brazil and Argentina without waiting for these to be delivered. Because of the blockade he stopped making payments. Brazil negotiated to purchase the work-in-progress and to have it completed; and hence took delivery of the ironclads Bahia, Colombo, Lima Barros, Cabral and Silvado, all of which were originally destined for Paraguay. According to Burton it was the general opinion that with just one ironclad Paraguay could have cleared the river.

=== Little armour-piercing weaponry ===
She also had little armour-piercing shot, and for the same reason. According to the diplomat Gregorio Benítes, who represented Paraguay abroad during the war:

If Marshal López had not been precipitate in accepting the war, to which he was provoked by the Empire of Brazil, and had he given himself time enough to take delivery of the great monitors and armaments which he had ordered in Europe, among the last some 36 coastal artillery pieces made on the Krupp system, contracted for in Germany with the personal intervention of the undersigned, then not a single fresh-water ironclad would have been able to attack the aforementioned fortresses with success, if they had been armed with that powerful artillery.

In effect, whoever has any idea of the formidable power of Krupp artillery, will understand that such cannon being mounted in the batteries of Curuzú, Curupaity and Humaitá, the triple alliance would not have had one single ironclad which could venture under their fires, on pain of certain disaster. Furthermore, López left it too late to order these weapons; so that the Baron of Itajubá the Brazilian accredited diplomat in Berlin, on finding out about the acquisition of those cannon on behalf of Paraguay, made use of his right under international law to require the detention of the said artillery.

== Allied initiative ==
On 5 August 1867 Mitre presented a plan to his nominal subordinate the commander of the Brazilian land forces the Marquis of Caxias. Its preferred feature was the capture of Humaitá by cutting off its lines of communication: the land forces would flank the fortress to the east and the naval forces would interdict river communications. For this to be done, the Brazilian naval forces had to force the river passage. Caxias agreed, and ordered the Brazilian admiral Joaquim José Inácio to proceed. But the latter was not at all keen: Humaitá was a very strong point and, if the Brazilian squadron did get past it, how would it communicate with its forward base presently at Curuzú? It would be trapped.

Caxias was impressed by Inácio's reasoning and told Mitre so. Mitre was for once insistent, and there followed a correspondence in which, eventually, the Brazilian admiral agreed to attack the preliminary outwork of Curupayty – a few miles down the river – and, if he got past there, to assail Humaitá at a later date.

== Passage of Curupayty ==
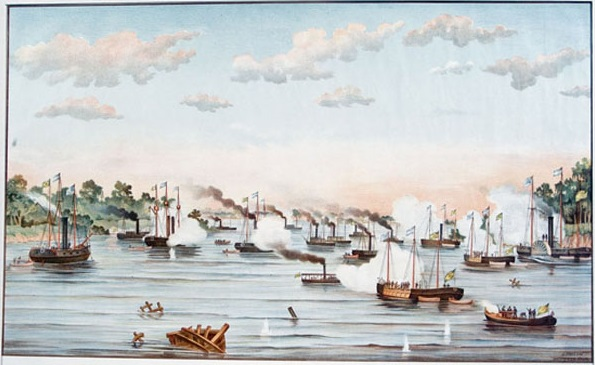
Passage of Curupayty by Júlio Raison

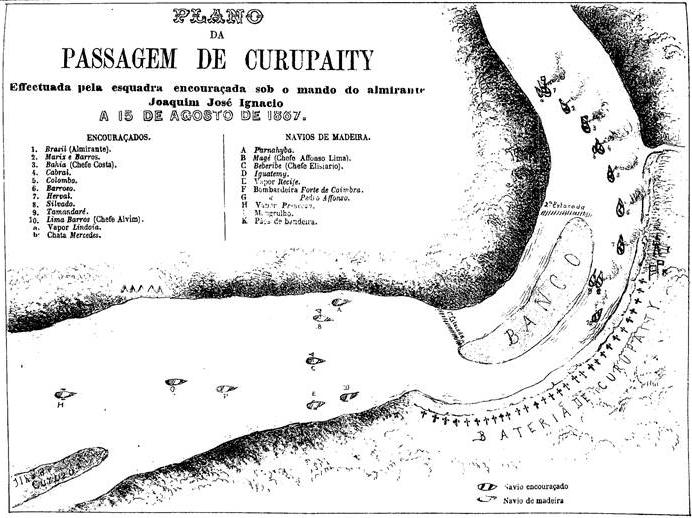
The dash past the fortress of Curupayty. On the right, the ironclads are risking the channel nearer to the guns – rightly, as it turned out – while the wooden vessels (on left) are providing covering fire

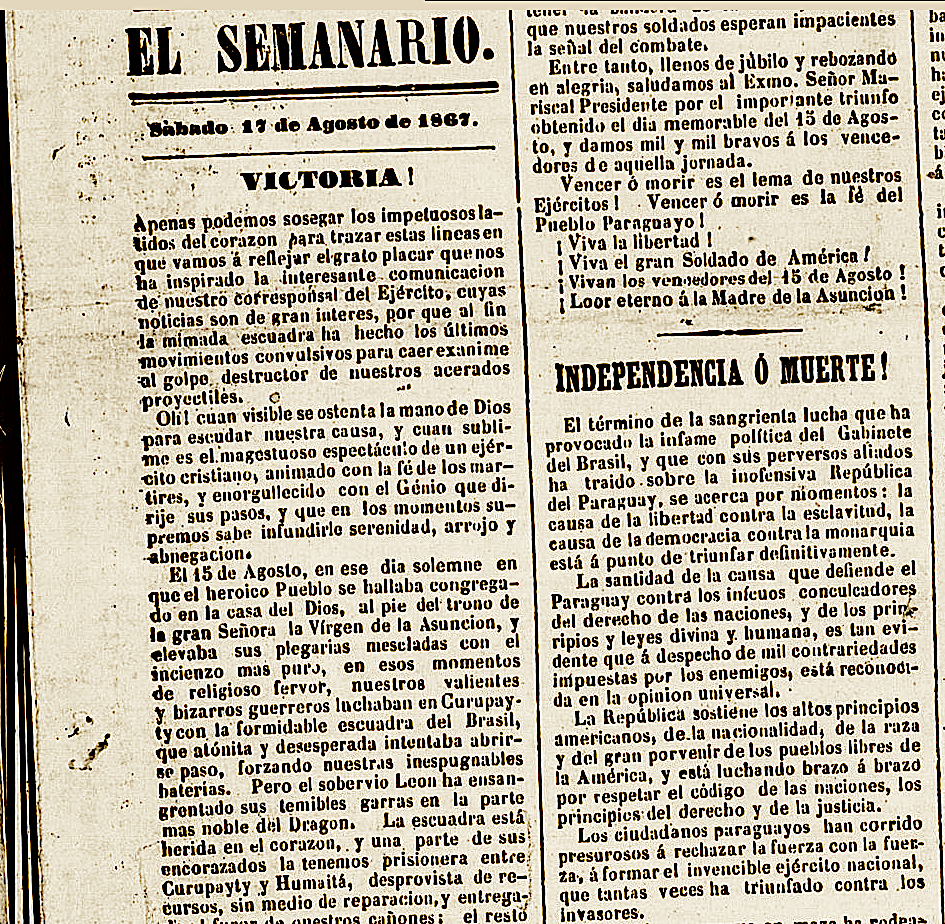
The Paraguayan government newspaper claims a victory. It said the ironclads were hopelessly trapped between Curupaty and Humaitá

Curupayty was an outwork a few miles downriver from the fortress of Humaitá, and part of the Humaitá defensive complex. It lay at the corner of the Quadrilateral – the line of earthworks that protected Humaitá from seizure on its landward side – at the site where the disastrous land battle had taken place. Its river artillery alone comprised 35 heavy guns; indeed the Paraguayans had partly denuded Humaitá of guns to reinforce Curupayty. The largest gun threw a spherical 10-inch (25 cm) shot; it was called the Cristiano (because it was made by melting down bells contributed by all the churches of Paraguay).

=== The Brazilian ironclads dash past the lower fort ===
On 15 August 1867 at 0640 hours the Brazilian ironclads went into action. They were:

| Division | Vessel | Origin | Commander |
|---|---|---|---|
| 2nd Division (Rodrigues da Costa) | Brasil (admiral's flagship) | | Salgado |
| | Mariz e Barros | | Neves de Mendonça |
| | Tamandaré | | Elisário Barbosa |
| | Colombo | P | Bernardino de Queiroz |
| | Bahia (divisional flagship) | P | Pereira dos Santos |
| 1st Division (Tôrres o Alvim) | Cabral | P | Gerônimo Gonçalves |
| | Barroso | | Silveira da Mota |
| | Herval | | Mimede Simões |
| | Silvado | P | Macedo Coimbra |
| | Lima Barros (divisional flagship) | P | Garsino de Sá |

In the table the symbol P denotes that the vessel had originally been ordered by Paraguay, but obtained by Brazil in the circumstances already explained.

The Brazilian admiral Joaquim Inácio was in overall command from the bridge of Brasil. Lashed to the port side of Brasil was the steam messenger Lindoya (to assist her in turning); Colombo and Cabral each towed a chata (flat-bottomed barge).

At this point the river had two channels. One was deeper, but it ran closer to ("within pistol shot of"") the enemy batteries, and the current was stronger. In the other, or shallow, channel the risk of running aground was far greater; furthermore, a Paraguayan deserter claimed torpedoes had been placed there recently. Inácio chose to proceed by the channel closer to the batteries, and his choice was vindicated. While wooden vessels of the Brazilian navy provided covering fire the ironclads dashed past Curupaty. It took each vessel about 40 minutes to get past.

Even so, some vessels were badly damaged. A shot penetrated Tamandaré through a gunport killing or wounding 14 of her crew. Her engine was damaged and stopped leaving her adrift under the guns of the fort; she was rescued by Silvado who threw her a cable and took her in tow. Tamandaré's commander Elisário Barbosa lost his left arm. According to Commander Kennedy RN the accident to Tamandaré obliged Colombo, which was following astern, to stop her engines in order to avoid fouling her. The strong current brought her broadside on, making her unmanageable. She drifted close to the Paraguayan guns, which did some very serious damage before she could be backed out of her dangerous position. There were 25 Brazilian casualties including three killed. The ironclads, by taking the channel nearest to the Paraguayan guns, had escaped a more serious danger, for a number of torpedoes were afterwards found laid down in the other channel.

For this feat on 27 September Joaquim Inácio was awarded the noble title of Barão de Inhaúma (Baron of Inhaúma).

According to Paraguay's then chief engineer George Thompson, López gave it out that he had allowed the fleet to pass Curupayty on purpose, to trap it and starve it out, and that it would soon have to repass Curupayty, where he would sink it. This is corroborated by Juan Crisóstomo Centurión, a Paraguayan journalist working for the López regime at the time. The government newspaper El Semanario de Avisos y Conocimientors Útiles claimed a victory, writing: "The [Brazilian squadron is wounded in the heart, and we have one part of its ironclads prisoner between Curupaty and Humaitá, devoid of resources, without means of repair, and given over to the fury of our cannon; the rest will have to come to its aid, and follow the same road of shame and defeat". And "The ironclads must now make every effort to patch themselves up; but the impacts made by the solid shot of Curupayty cannot be repaired, except in arsenals, and none of those can be found between Curupaty and Humaità.

== The chain boom of Humaitá deters Inácio ==
Inácio sent Barroso upriver to reconnoitre Humaitá; she reported that the river was indeed blocked by a boom of three parallel chains floating on pontoons. The tactical problem now was how to get past the chain boom.

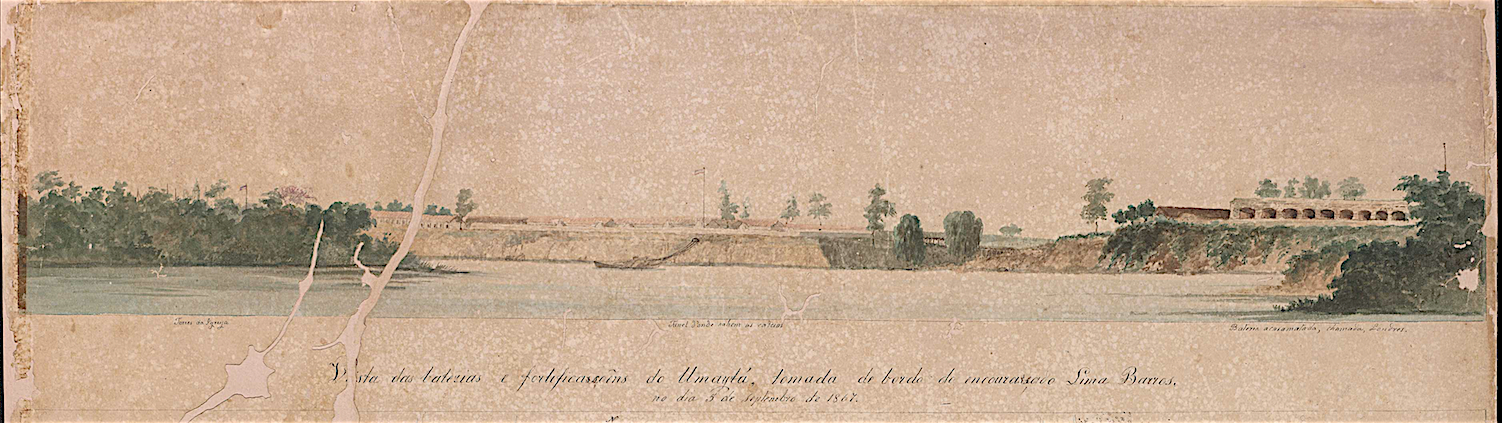
The chain boom revealed (horizontally scroll). Humaitá sketched from the Brazilian ironclad Lima Barros, within telescope range, 5 September 1867. This military document, albeit in poor condition, survives at the National Library of Brazil. The Londres battery is visible on the right. Notice at the centre, below the flagstaff, the chain boom: from the brick tunnel in the river bank it extends to a floating support, then vanishes underwater. (However, Lima Barros was observing the fortress at a slant angle, and could not see most of the batteries. They were located to the right of this picture, and would have to be passed.)

There was some military know-how about this. According to a professional paper published some years before by the Corps of Royal Engineers in Dublin a heavy steamship could snap almost any chain provided it was moving fast enough; for this reason it was prudent for the defenders to provide three chains − breaking the first reduced the ship's velocity. The paper said that a 1,000 ton ship steaming at 15 knots could snap a chain of 2.5-inch round iron links. The chain link diameter at Humaitá was not known to the attackers; the largest ironclad (Brasil) was 1,500 tons but her top speed was only 11.3 knots; she would be steaming against an adverse current of up to 3 knots; and not one, but three chains were reported.

In his memoirs the Brazilian minister of marine wrote they knew that their ships would have to proceed single file in the narrow channel: if the first failed to snap the chain it could neither back up nor turn round, nor get up enough way for a second, successful attempt at the chain. The vessels would be trapped under the guns of Humaitá. Further, the Brazilians feared that the Paraguayans, who were desperate to get their hands on an ironclad, might try to seize the isolated vessel by human wave boarding tactics (which, indeed, the Paraguayans tried to do more than once on later occasions). The snapping method was not tried.

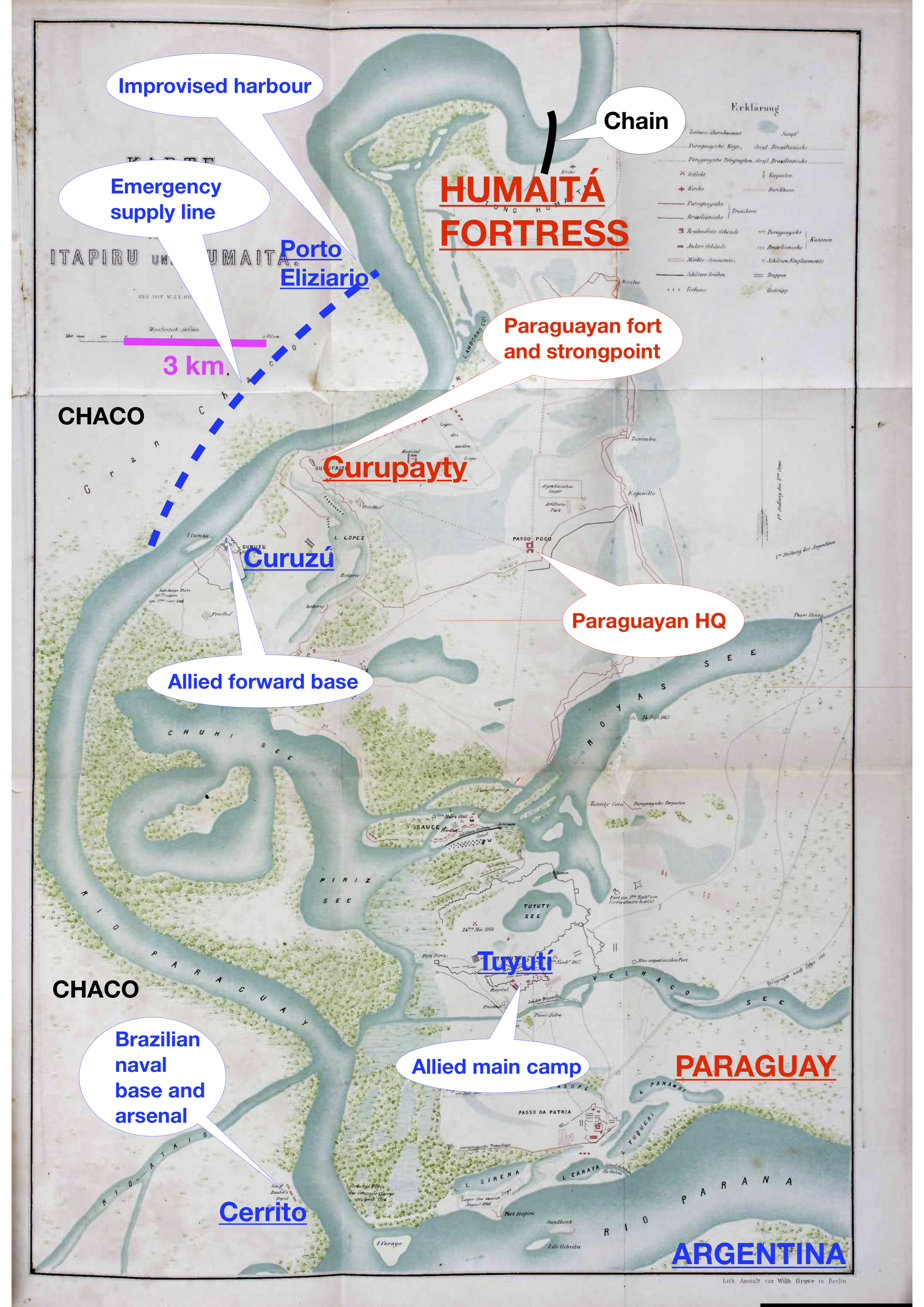
Humaitá in late 1867, with the ironclads trapped above Curupaty. The ironclads moored at porto Elisário and were supplied by an emergency route through the almost impassable Chaco

There were alternative, if heroic, methods of severing a chain boom. Sending out a party under the defending guns to cut it with a cold chisel was one. Seizing the chain house or blowing it up with gunpowder were others. Both methods were urged upon the Brazilians by General Mitre but were not attempted.

The river was falling.

From the main article on Inácio it appears that he was prone to depression; on 30 August he sent his subordinate commanders a questionnaire as to the feasibility of passing Humaitá; the questions suggested the answers he wished to receive; for example:

Finally: in the present revolutionary circumstances of the Republics of the River Plate [meaning Argentina], knowing their feelings about the Empire of Brazil, is it prudent to risk the most important part of our Navy to a certain and inevitable ruin, without being convinced that it avoids a greater evil, or gives success to our cause and triumph to our arms?

His subordinates responded appropriately.

Inácio informed Caxias: "I shall not risk the fleet". On 26 August Caxias told Mitre that, shortly, the fleet would need to retire again below Curupayty; in those circumstances it would be "unpardonable recklessness" to attempt to pass Humaitá; accordingly, he intended to order it to retire to its original position.

There followed a correspondence between Mitre and Caxias in which the nominal commander-in-chief and his nominal subordinate argued the toss in the diplomatic language of the era; Mitre reminded him of the divers occasions when (he claimed) the navy had let them down. To descend below Curupayty again would look weak, as well as exposing the ironclads to battery fire, torpedoes and the risk of seizure by boarding. The ironclads stayed above Curupayty.

According to George Thompson, if the ironclads had attempted to pass Humaitá at that point they would have faced only three 8-inch guns and about six 32-pounders; the other guns had been taken to reinforce Curupayty.

== The Brazilian ironclads are trapped between the forts of Curupayty and Humaitá ==
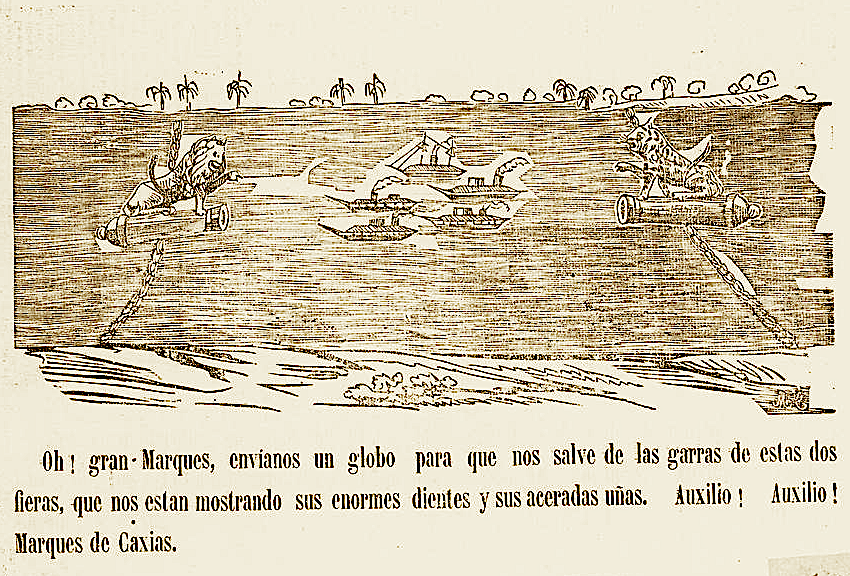
Propaganda cartoon in Paraguayan army newspaper, 23 August 1867. The caption depicts the Brazilians saying: "Oh, great marquis, send us a balloon to save us from the clutches of these two beasts, who are baring to us their enormous teeth and steel claws. Help, help, Marquis de Caxias!

The vessels were in enemy waters between two fires: Curupaty and Humaitá. The river fell, and would not reach maximum until sometime in 1868. It now became necessary to extend the Brazilian navy's lines of communication – already long by the standards of the day – even further.

=== The Brazilian navy establishes a regular steamship line to supply its warships in the River Paraguay ===
On 4 October 1867 the navy minister Afonso Celso de Assis Figueiredo by order established a liner service from Rio de Janeiro, Brazil exclusively to supply the Brazilian navy in Paraguay. Using four steamships, it had scheduled sailings, each way, on the 15th and 30th of every month. From Rio steamers stopped to coal at Montevideo, Uruguay and then steamed non-stop to Corrientes, Argentina to drop off correspondence before proceeding to the naval arsenal of Cerrito near the mouth of the River Paraguay. According to Afonso Celso's memoirs whatever the Brazilian vice-admiral asked for was promptly supplied from Rio.

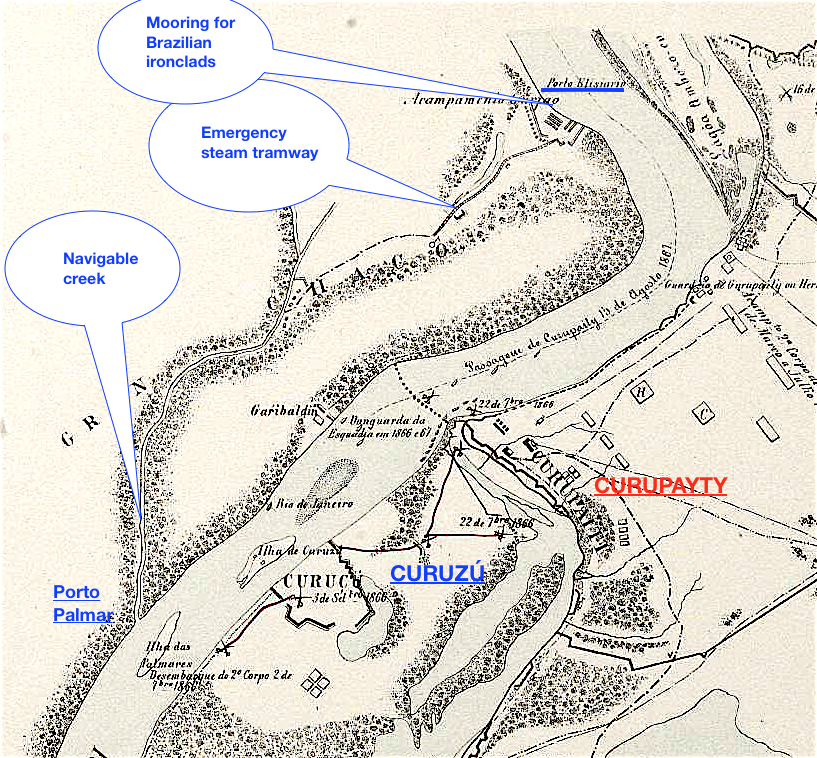
Emergency line through the Chaco built by the Brazilian navy to supply their ironclads trapped above Curupayty. It included a steam tramway whose sleepers almost floated on the boggy ground.

=== The Brazilian navy builds an emergency military railway through the Chaco to its trapped ironclads ===
However, since the ironclads were cut off above the fort of Curupayty, the Brazilian government at once ordered the navy to build a supply line through the Chaco. The Chaco is the territory to the west of the River Paraguay. In those days it was claimed by both Argentina and Paraguay, but was uninhabited, except by a few nomads. In this coastal region it was almost impassable swamp.

The supply line, named Affonso Celso after the minister of marine, ran between two improvised harbours on the west bank of the river, i.e. inland through the Chaco. They were dubbed "porto Palmar" (where the wooden vessels moored, below Curupayty) and "porto Elisário" (above); both were out of range of the Paraguayan guns. The ironclads moored at porto Elisário.

It was possible to travel some of the way by a navigable creek called Riacho Quîá. From there the Brazilian navy at great effort built a military railway or tramway. At first drawn by animal power, later by an improvised steam engine, the line carried artillery guns, steam launches and heavy ammunition, as well as coal and other supplies. It was reported that the line conveyed 65 tons of supplies a day, its sleepers almost floating on the boggy ground.

=== The ironclads shell Humaitá ===
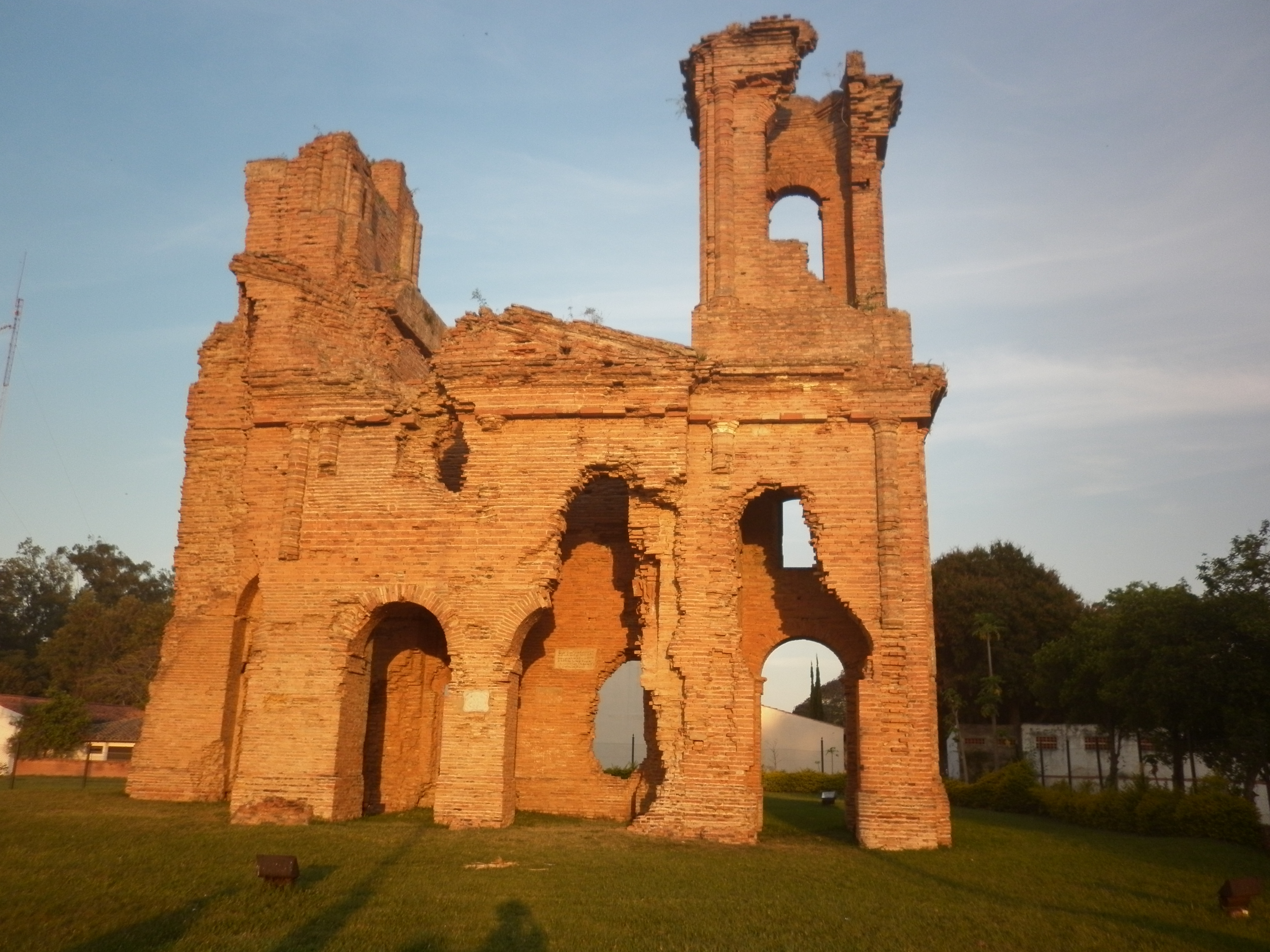
The ruins of the church of San Carlos Borromeo today. Part of the Fortress complex, the church was the only object in Humaitá visible to the Brazilian ironclads.

For five months the ironclads stayed in this precarious (and, from a sanitary point of view, deplorable) position, frequently going out to shell Humaitá, but not doing much damage. The only installation they could clearly see to hit was the church of San Carlos Borromeo, and they fired at it. Wrote Burton: "The Brazilians banged at the fane persistently as an Anglo-Indian gunner at a flagstaff; and the Paraguayans at times amused themselves with repairing it." Another source says that church was respected at first, but then shelled on purpose because Caxias claimed it was being used as a powder magazine and a watchtower. Its ruins still stand today, a tourist attraction, practically the only part of the fortress of Humaitá that survives.

According to Artur Silveira da Mota, Admiral Inácio sank into inertia, rarely leaving his cabin aboard Brasil, instead writing picturesque articles for the weekly Semana Illustrada under the pen name Leva-Arriba (Get Up and Go), "a pseudonym which circumstances did not permit him to confirm by deeds".

=== The ironclads sink the chain boom's floating supports ===
During this time the ironclads did perform one action favourable to the Allied cause: they sank the chain boom.

Formidable as it was, Humaitá had a weakness. According to military doctrine a chain boom should never rest on hollow floating supports, for the enemy might sink them.

[T]he buoys must be solid, as in a dark or misty night they [hollow ones] are easily scuttled … the Boom must be quite independent of these last as to buoyancy.

The chain should be secured to solid floating supports; thick wooden logs or condemned ship's masts were recommended. This detail eluded the designer of Humaitá. In the words of teniente-coronel George Thompson of the Paraguayan army, the chains were

supported on a number of canoes, and on three pontoons. The [Brazilian] ironclads fired for three months at these pontoons and canoes, sinking all of them, when, of course, the chain went to the bottom, as the river there is about 700 yards wide, and the chain could not be drawn tight without intermediate supports. The chain was thus buried some two feet under the mud of the river, offering no obstacle whatever to the navigation.

== Paraguay takes advantage of the delay to improve its position ==
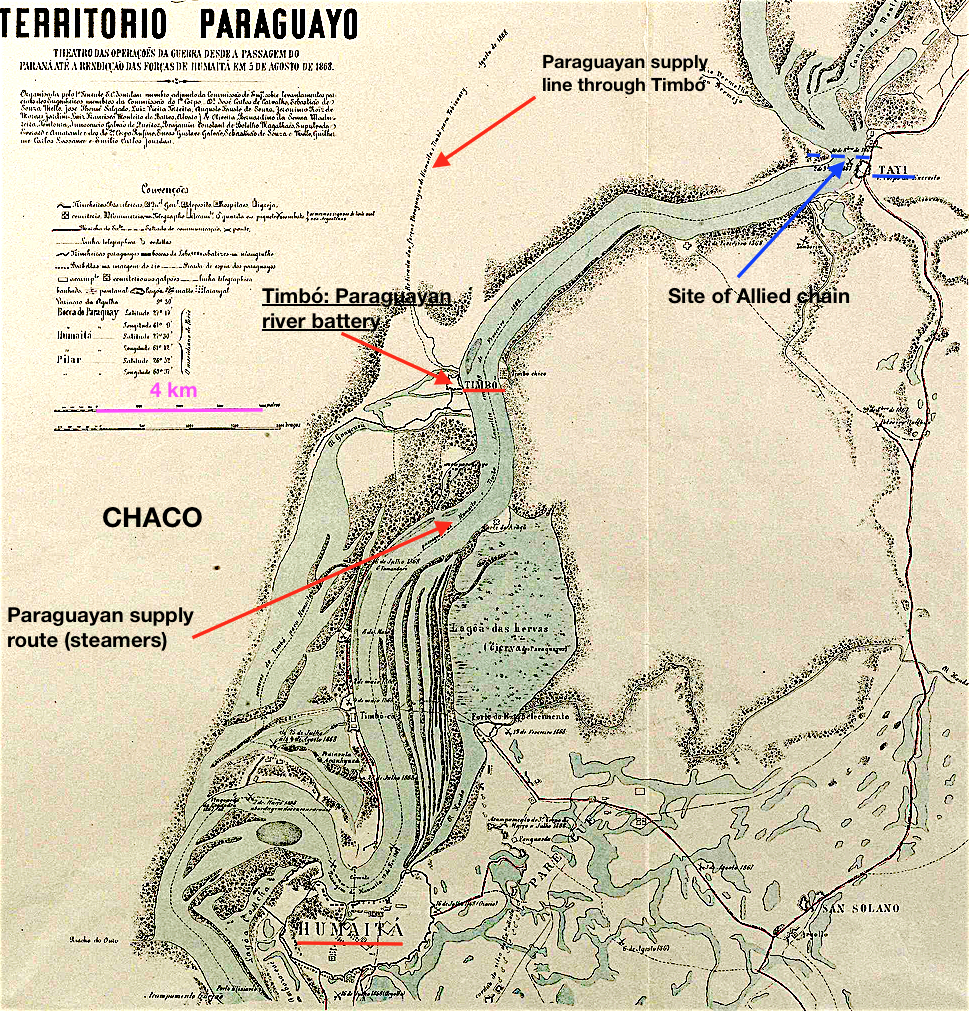
The scene north of Humaitá in late 1867. The Allies blocked the river at Tayí, but Paraguay made a road through the Chaco to Timbó. From there, two paddle-steamers resupplied the fortress.

=== 1. The Paraguayans build a supply road through the Chaco ===
Even before the passage of Curupayty was accomplished López started to build a road through the Chaco to supply Humaitá. It ended at Timbó, the nearest place on the opposite bank where a landing could be achieved. Despite the appalling nature of the terrain the road ran for 54 miles. The greater part of it went through deep mud; the Bermejo River had to be crossed, and five other deep streams.

The Paraguayan steamers Tacuarí and Ygurey did all the transport work between Timbó and Humaitá, landing opposite the church, and out of sight of the Brazilian ironclads. Thus even when the Allies had cut off Humaitá by land Caxias could see these Paraguayan steamships continuing to replenish the fortress.

=== 2. The Paraguayans bring the Curupayty guns to reinforce Humaitá ===
Since the ironclads showed no sign of retreating below Curupaty, the Paraguayans had time to remove nearly all its heavy guns, convey them by land, and mount them at the next obstacle, Humaitá. Commented George Thompson:

[S]o that the fleet, by its wretched slowness, had to pass the same guns again at Humaitá.

=== 3. López establishes a surprise battery at Timbó ===
At the beginning of February 1868 López sent George Thompson to start a battery at Timbò. He placed six 8-inch (20 cm) guns and eight 32-pounders. The bank of the River Paraguay on the Chaco side is low, so the guns were placed on timber platforms.

As will be described, this battery, whose existence was not suspected by the Brazilians, was even more damaging to their vessels than Humaitá.

== Decision to force the passage of Humaitá ==
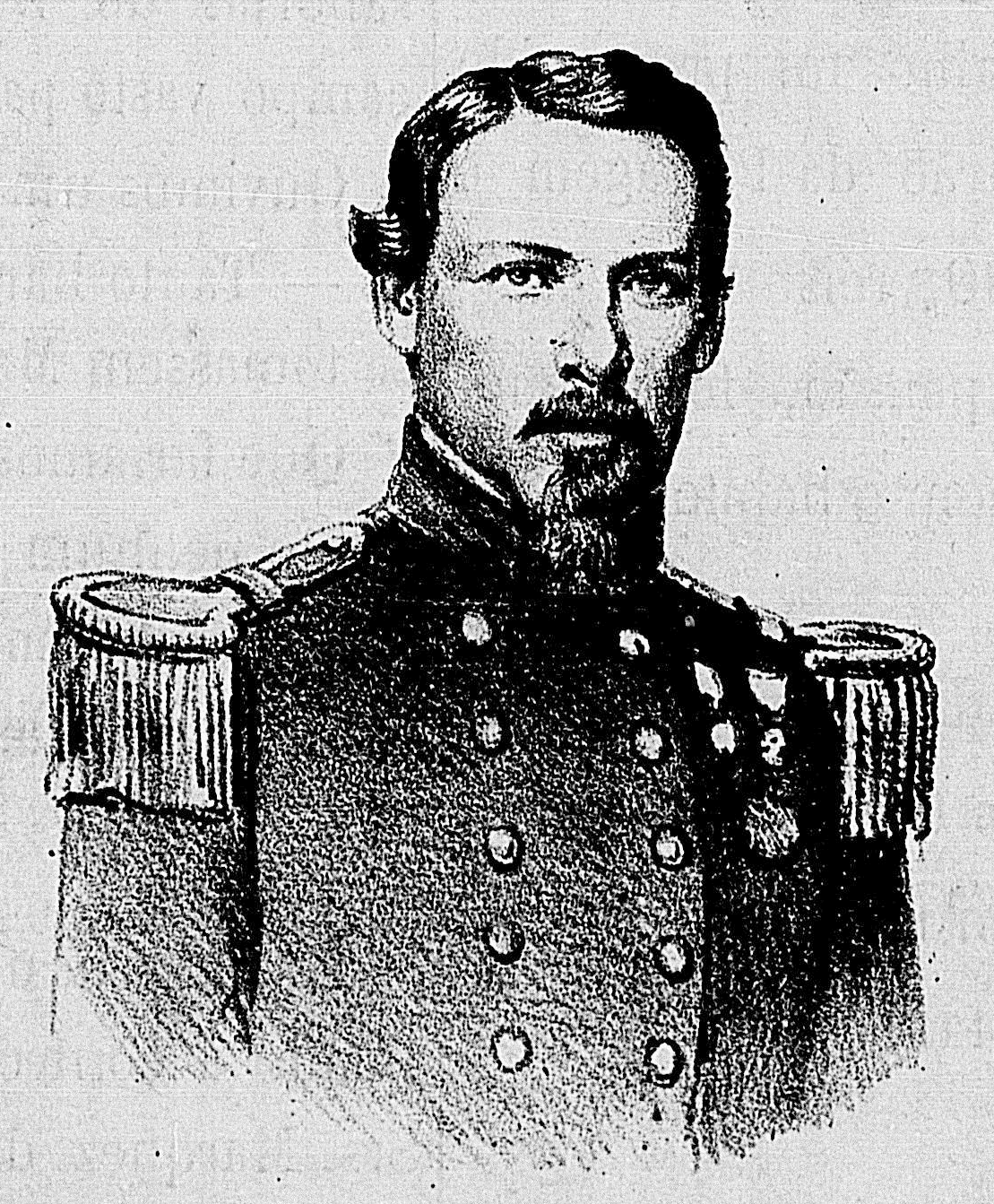
Delfim Carlos de Carvalho, the officer in command, was given the noble title Barão de Passagem for achieving the passage of Humaitá.

On 14 March 1868 Mitre left Paraguay for the last time, returning to assume leadership of Argentina, the Argentine vice-president having died of cholera. The overall command of the allied forces, military and naval, was now Brazilian. Furthermore, the new shallow draft monitors Pará, Alagoas and Rio Grande do Norte had arrived in Paraguay, as requested by Inácio. The Brazilian government kept exhorting Inácio to attempt the passage of Humaitá.

By this time the Allied land forces had executed a strategic flanking manoeuvre, bypassing the Fortress complex on its east, eventually rejoining the bank of the River Paraguay at Tayí, well to the north of Humaitá (see map). The Fortress was now entirely cut off by land, but could still be supplied by river.

To try to impede this the Allies stretched chains across the river, above Humaitá, in the vicinity of Tayí. However the Paraguayans continued to supply Humaitá anyway, from the Chaco side, using the road they had previously made to Timbó on the opposite bank. From Timbó to Humaitá was a short river journey by steamer, of which Paraguay deployed a pair. See the map The scene north of Humaitá in late 1867.

In February 1868 the river rose to an unusually high level, but then it started to turn, on the 16th falling back by some inches. It became imperative to force the passage of Humaitá without further delay.

Ignácio had run out of excuses. But he was not prepared to lead the squadron past Humaitá because he still considered the feat to be impossible. His son-in-law Delfim Carlos de Carvalho (1825–1896) volunteered to lead the squadron.

== Arrival of the river monitors ==
On 12 February 1868 the shallow draught river monitors Alagôas, Pará and Rio Grande arrived below Curupaty. These vessels had been built at the Imperial Naval yard in Rio de Janeiro and were purpose-designed by the Brazilian naval architect Napoleão João Baptista Level (1828–1915) to attempt the passage of Humaitá.

According to George Thompson they were propelled by twin screws, had a 4-inch (10 cm) armour plating, and stood only a foot (30 cm) out of the water, apart from a single rotary turret armed with a Whitworth gun.

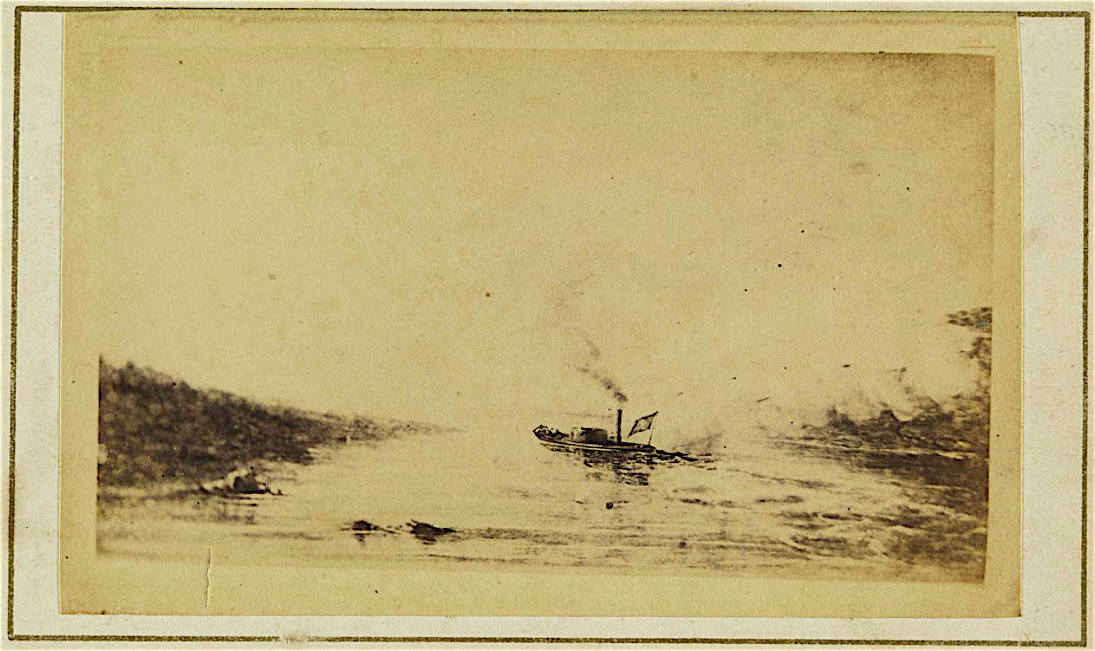
A photograph of the Brazilian river monitor Alagoas near Humaitá. Note the low profile presented to enemy artillery.

The porthole for this gun was made circular, and barely larger than the muzzle of the gun, which, when it was run out, was flush with the face of the turret, almost filling the porthole, so that there was absolutely no part of these monitors exposed. The elevation and depression of the gun was obtained by a double carriage, which raised or lowered the trunnions of the gun at will − the muzzle always being at the height of the porthole. So little of the hull was visible that they were very difficult to hit.

Only six months after the passage of Humaitá the author and explorer Captain Sir Richard Burton was at Humaitá, and he wrote:

We inspected the Alagôas, a most efficient river-craft, drawing four feet ten inches, with high-pressure engines, which pant and puff like those of a railway, and armed like the Rio Grande and the Pará, with 70-pounder muzzle-loading Whitworths ... The crews numbered thirty-six to thirty-nine men, of whom four work the turret and four the guns. The turret, whose invention belongs to Captain Cowper Coles, was made oval, an improvement, according to the Brazilians, upon the circular tower. The thickness of the iron plates varied from a minimum of four and a half inches to a maximum of six inches about the gun, whose muzzle fitted tight to its port. This skin was backed by eighteen inches of Brazilian sucupira and peroba, more rigid and durable than our heart of oak.

These monitors prepared to run the gauntlet of fort Curupayty. However, they needed to pause for repairs, and passed Curupayty on the 13th.

== How the passage of Humaitá was effected ==
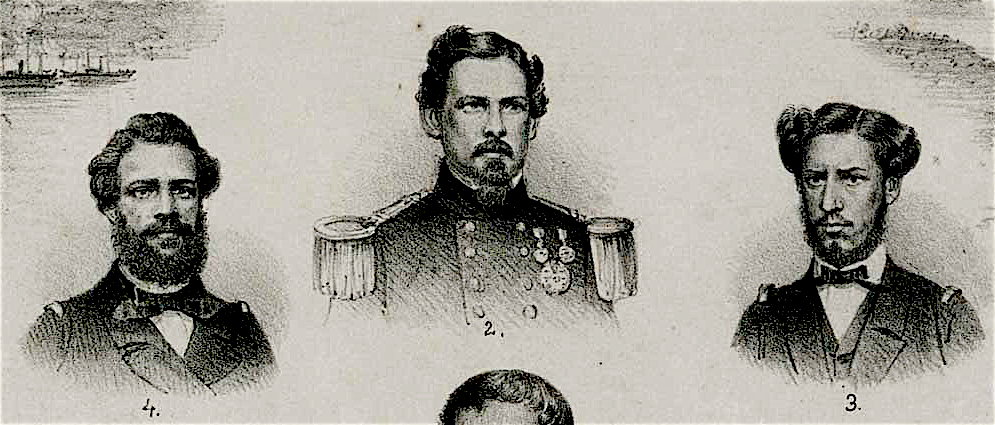
"Heroes of the Passage of Humaitá" depicted in a cartoon. (L to R): Artur Silveira da Mota; (who commanded the lead vessel); Carlos de Carvalho (divisional commander); Joaquim Mauriti (who ignored the order to turn back)

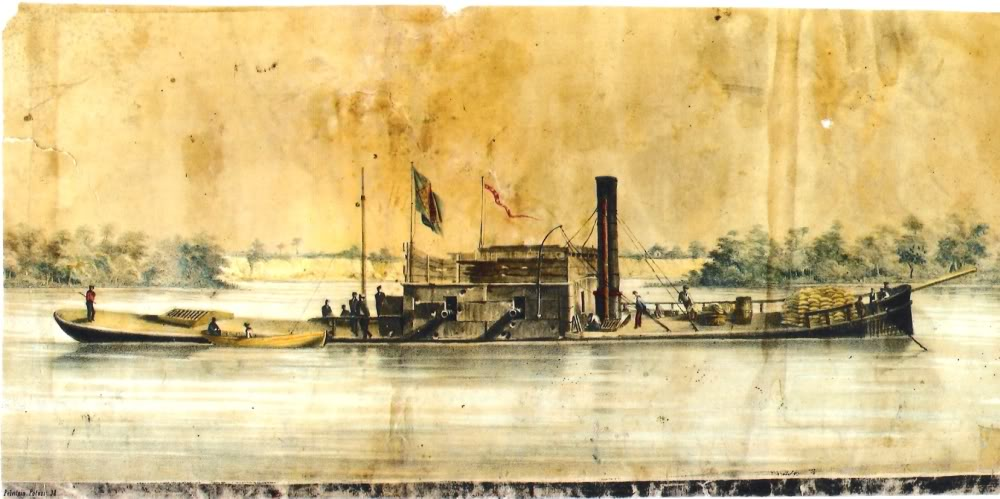
Barroso, the first ironclad to pass Humaitá

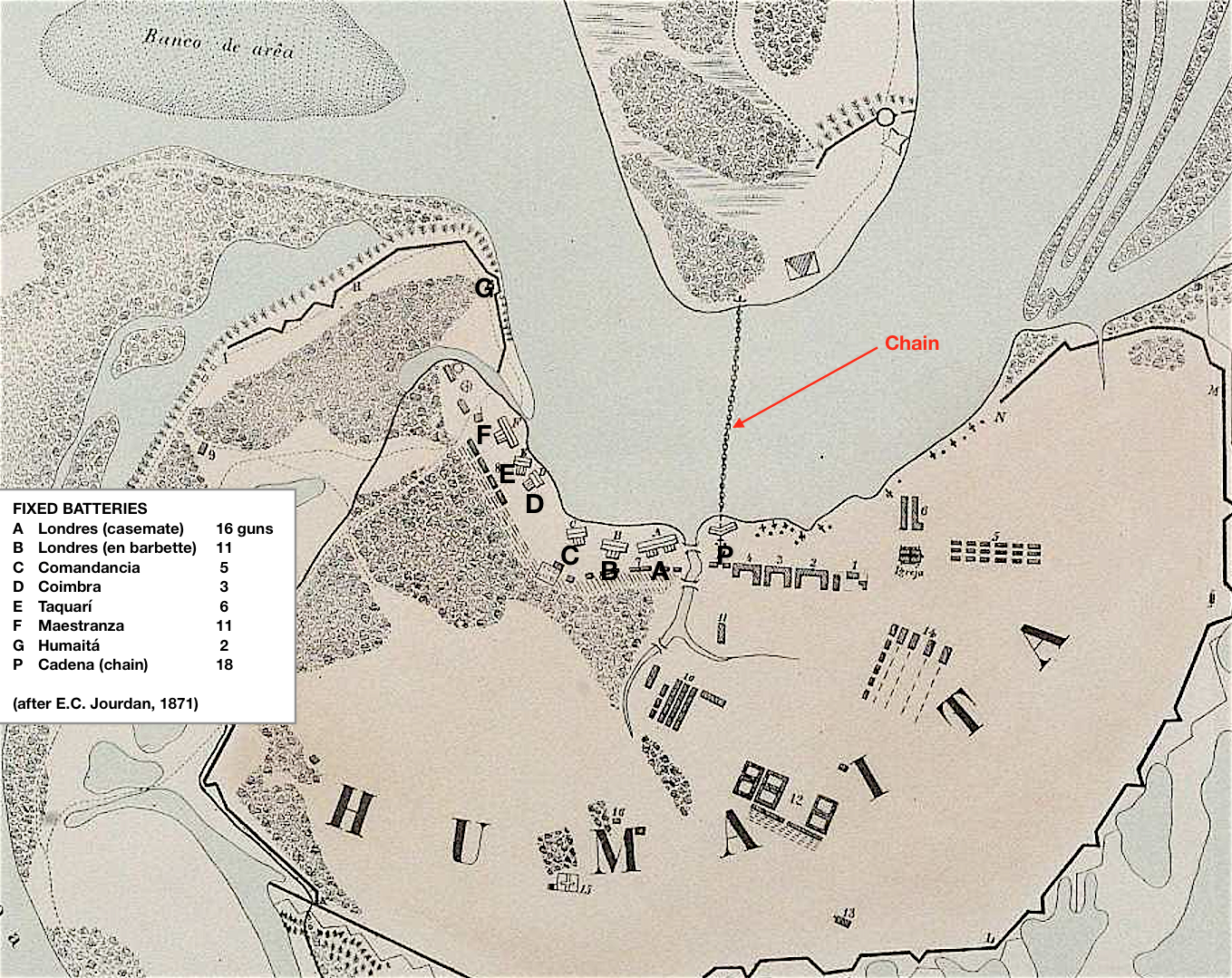
Batteries of the Fortress of Humaitá, according to E.C. Jourdan (1871) of the Brazilian corps of engineers

By the 16th the river's rise was enormous, and it was rumoured that the squadron intended to force the Humaitá batteries. On the 17th General Argolo received orders to carry out a diversionary land attack on the 19th.

The Brazilian command chose a different tactic than had worked earlier at Curupaty. This time they did not attempt a simultaneous dash by numerous vessels, intended to overwhelm the Paraguayan guns. Instead, there was to be a succession of independent dashes during the hours of darkness. Each dash, if successful, would launch a signal rocket. The vessels were to proceed in pairs: because the current was strong, the shallow draught river monitors, which had smaller engines, would be lashed to the port side of a larger vessel.

The squadron chosen to force the passage (19 February 1868) was as follows, and proceeded in this order:

=== First dash ===
| Vessel | Design role | Type | Displacement (normal) | Draught (mean) | Horse power | Crew | Commander |
|---|---|---|---|---|---|---|---|
| Barroso | Coastal defence battleship | Central battery ship | 1354 t | 9.0 ft | 130 | 132 | Artur Silveira da Mota |
| Rio Grande | Shallow draught river monitor | Turret ship | 490 t | 4.9 ft | 30 | 30 | Antônio Joaquim |

At about 04:00 hours a signal rocket from Barroso announced that the first pair had successfully passed over the chain boom, by now submerged in the river mud.

=== Second dash ===
| Vessel | Design role | Type | Displacement (normal) | Draught (mean) | Horse power | Crew | Commander |
|---|---|---|---|---|---|---|---|
| Bahia (flagship) | Coastal defence battleship | Turret ship | 1008 t | 7.75 ft | 140 | 133 | Guilherme José Pereira dos Santos |
| Alagoas | Shallow draught river monitor | Turret ship | 490 t | 4.9 ft | 30 | 32 | Joaquim Antônio Cordovil Maurity |

As this pair was passing the Cadenas battery a shot cut the cable by which Alagôas was fastened to Bahia, and she became detached. Bahia got clear by 04:50 hours, but Alagoas drifted downstream. According to Inácio's official report, she was ordered to abandon the attempt; but her commander (Lieutenant Maurity) turned a blind eye "like Nelson at Copenhagen". She then started and passed the site of the chain boom by herself. A shot from the batteries damaged her engine so she fell back a second time. The engineers having repaired her engines, she passed over the chain yet again. This monitor was under fire for two hours altogether, and did not get clear until 0530 hours.

=== Third dash ===
| Vessel | Design role | Type | Displacement (normal) | Draught (mean) | Horse power | Crew | Commander |
|---|---|---|---|---|---|---|---|
| Tamandaré | Coastal defence battleship | Central battery ship | 980 t | 8.0 ft | 80 | 105 | Augusto César Pires de Miranda |
| Pará | Shallow draught river monitor | Turret ship | 490 t | 4.9 ft | 30 | 30 | Custódio José de Melo |

=== Details ===
"The Marshall's artillery units fired enormous quantities of shell and canister into the air as the enemy fleet neared", wrote Professor Thomas L. Whigham. "Perhaps one hundred fifty guns were firing simultaneously. The din was terrific, and lasted over forty minutes."

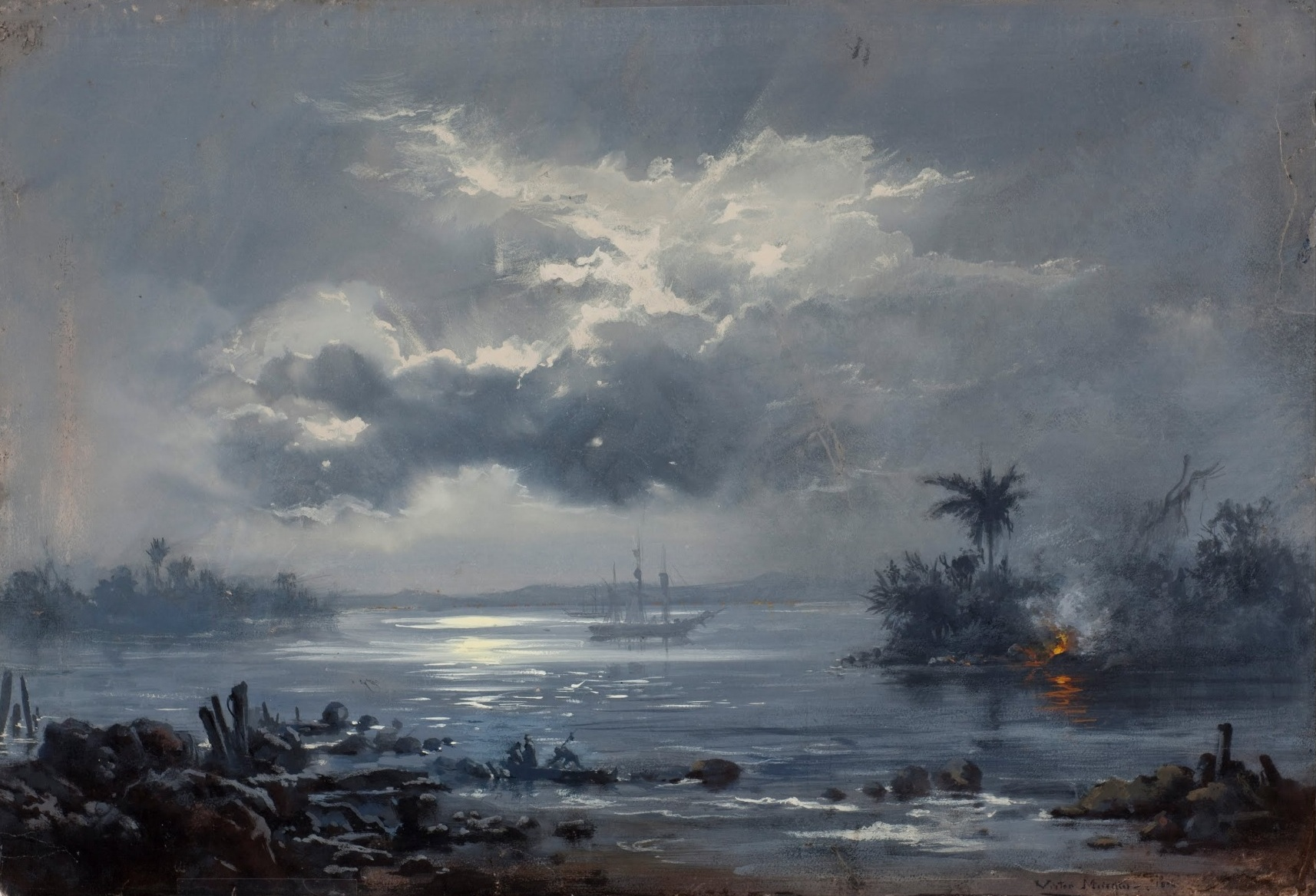
Study for The Passage of Humaitá (gouache on paper) by Victor Meirelles (1832–1903).

This was still the era of the wooden warship. Although iron-plated, all of these vessels (except Bahia), were built on timber frames. It was still possible to be wounded by wooden splinters detached by the mechanical shock of an incoming cannonball − as in the days of sailing ships − and in the ensuing action Barroso had one such case, as did Alagôas.

Delfim Carlos de Carvalho commanded from the bridge of Bahia.

The ironclads Lima Barros and Silvado provided covering fire. Meanwhile, the land forces launched a diversionary attack on the Cierva redoubt (called Establecimiento by the Brazilians).

In command of the fortress of Humaitá was colonel Paulino Alén. Colonel Francisco J. Martinez and the artillery commanders Pedro Gill, Remigio Cabral and Pedro Hermosa directed the river batteries.

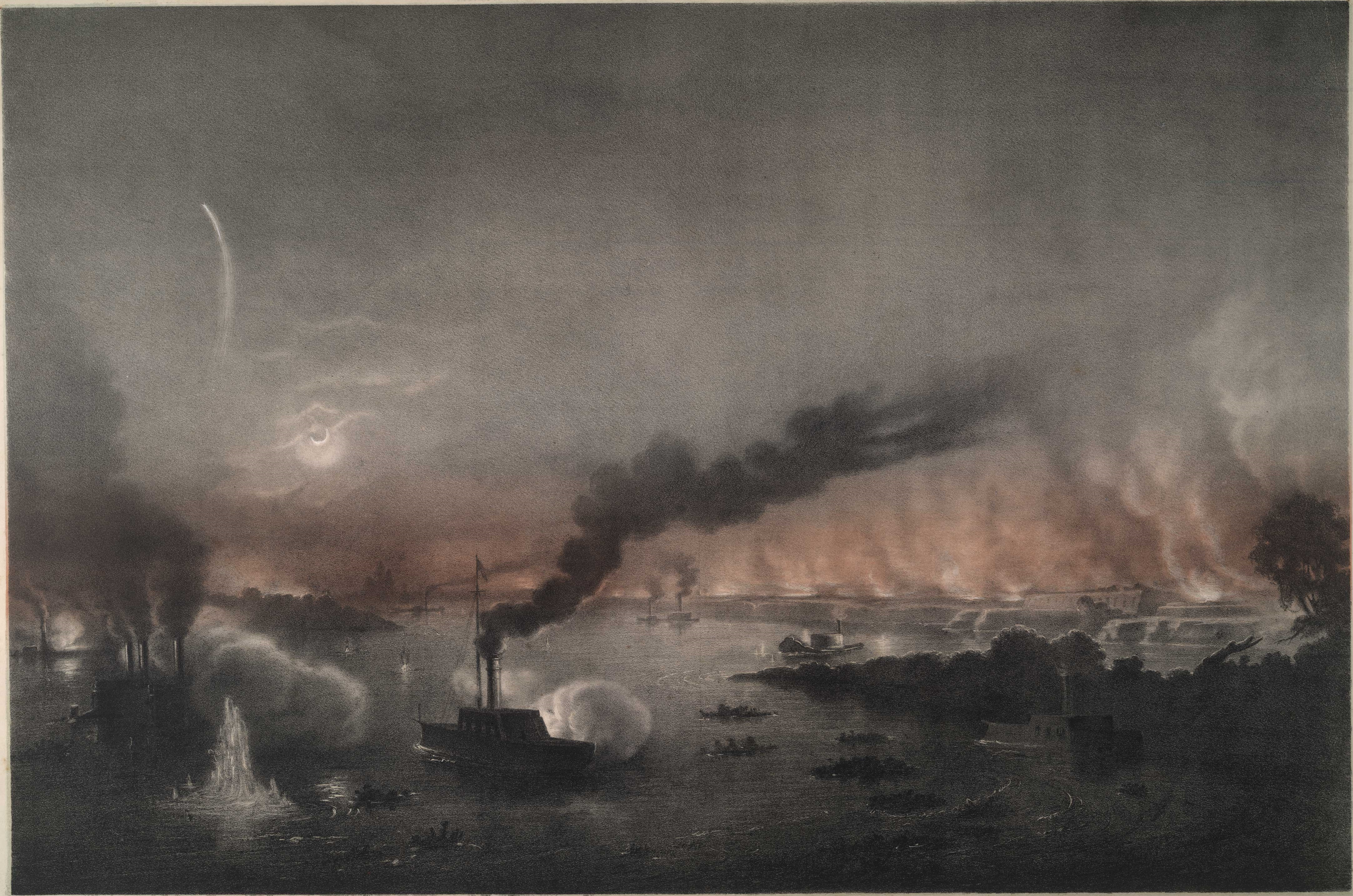
Passage of Humaitá, by Victor Meirelles

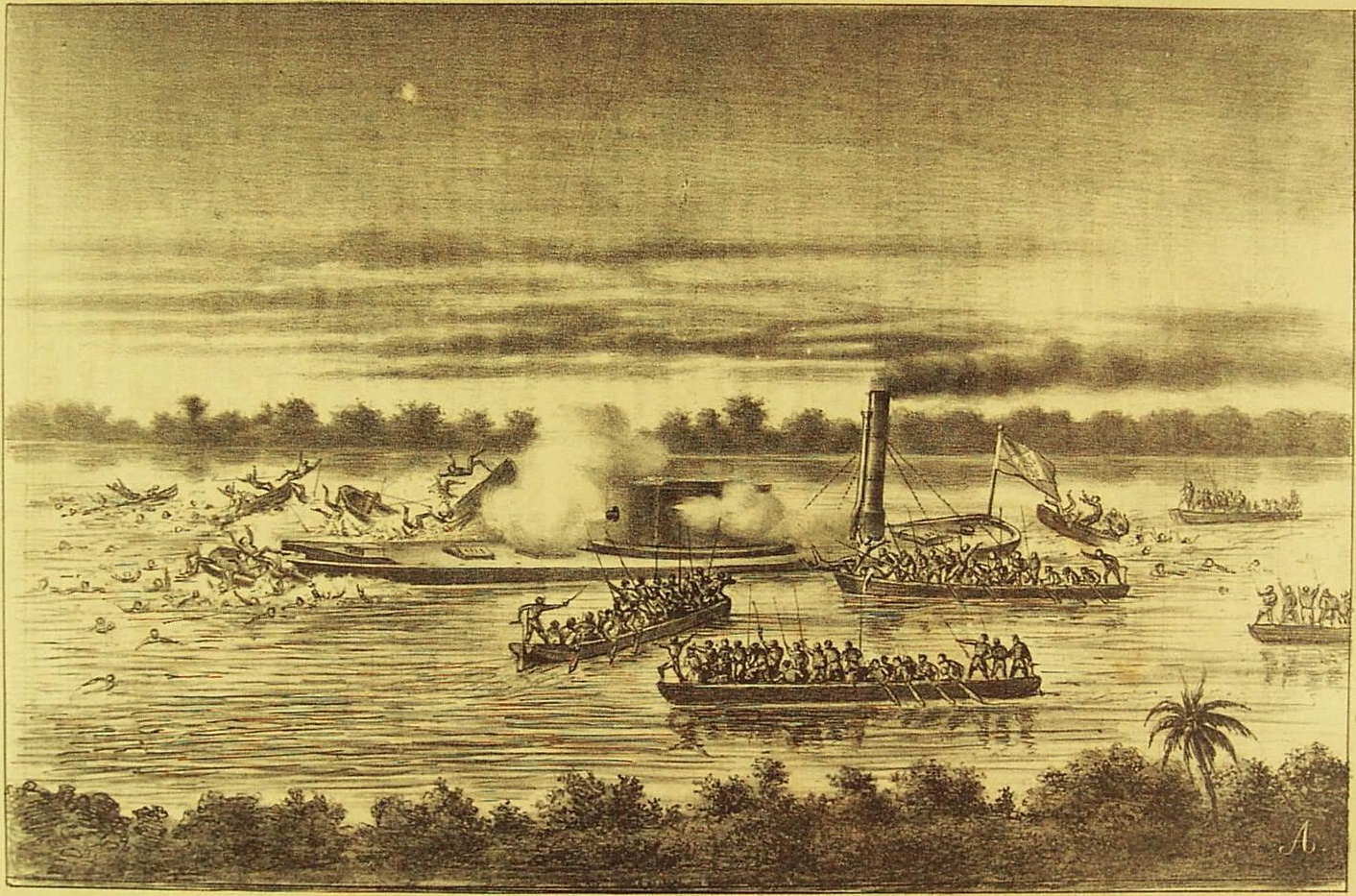
Paraguayan canoes attempting to board the monitor Alagoas, depicted by Brazilian cartoonist Angelo Agostini (1843–1910). The Paraguayans were desperate to capture an ironclad vessel and were to make similar attempts more than once

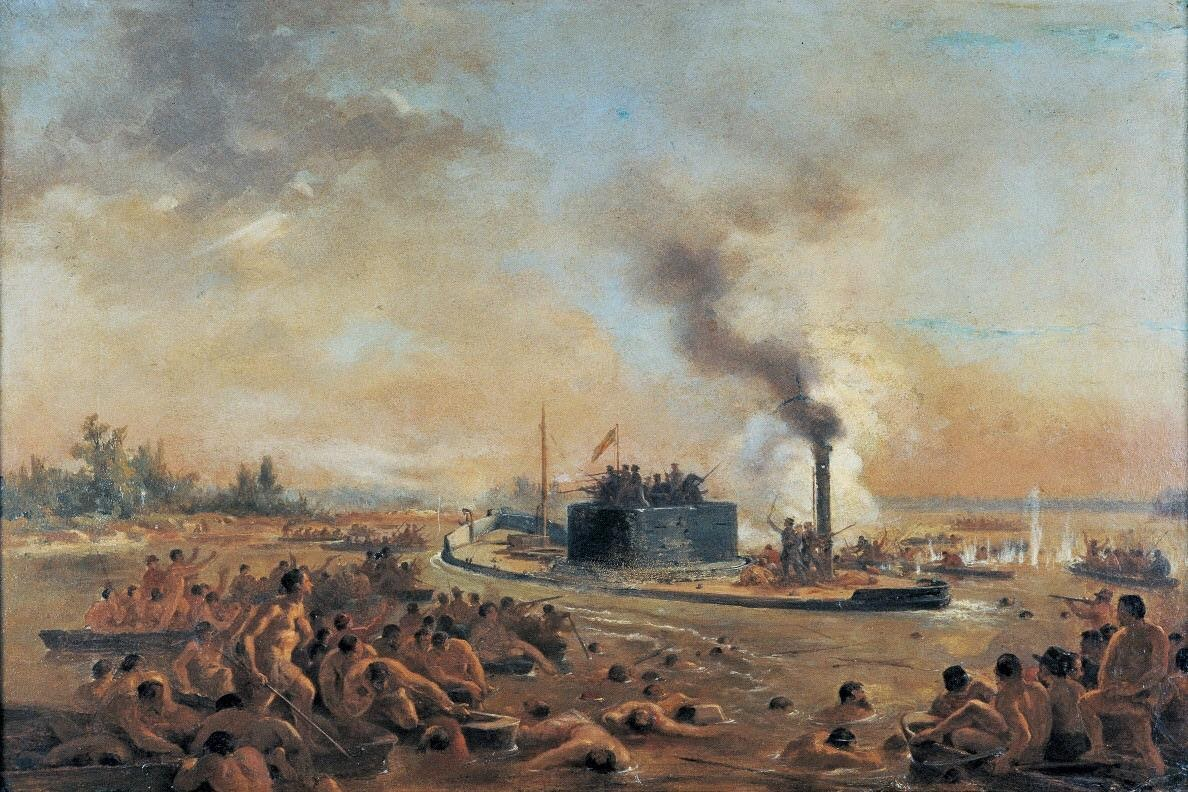
Another version by Victor Meirelles. Although Alagôas had an oval turret, the vessel in this painting is of the central casemate type. The Paraguayans who sought to board her were well armed and were not recorded using spears. Here, they are portrayed as naked amerindians

The Paraguayans had foreseen that the Brazilian attempt might be made at night time, and upon detecting the advance of the ironclads they let off rockets along the water's surface to light up the river. They also lit fires at three separate points on the Chaco coast: the light was strong enough to confuse the pilots. The river was so high that there were 12 to 15 feet of water over the chains; the squadron easily passed over. As the expedition kept near the Chaco bank most of the shots fell on the shore. Even so, the vessels were struck many times.

The two wooden steamers the Paraguayans used to replenish Humaitá hid in a lagoon, and the Brazilian squadron passed by without noticing them.

=== Surprises at Timbó ===
The Brazilians had not appreciated that the Paraguayans had established the other battery a few miles up the river at Timbó; when they steamed past, its unexpected fire did as much, or more damage to their squadron as Humaitá, because this battery was closer to the river surface; also, by then dawn had broken. Another source suggests that the best guns had been moved to Timbó. According to that source the ironclads were struck as follows:

| Vessel | No. of times hit by Humaitá | No. of times hit by Timbó |
|---|---|---|
| Barroso | 4 | 12 |
| Rio Grande | 0 | 6 |
| Bahia | 65 | 80 |
| Alagôas | lost count | 4 |
| Tamandaré | 0 | about 110 |
| Pará | 38 | 25 |

Examining Alagôas six months afterwards, Sir Richard Burton noted that the damage to her armour plating was still visible.

The bolts were often started, and the plates were deeply pitted by the 68-pounders, like plum-pudding from which the "plums" had been picked out. In some cases there were dented and even pierced by the Blakeley steel-tipped shot, of which Marshal-President López had but a small supply. Our naval officers have reported that the cast-iron projectiles impinging upon the armour, shivered into irregular fragments, which formed a hail of red-hot iron, and left the gun without a gunner to work it. The battery men always knew when a ball struck the plates at night, by the bright flash which followed the shock

As Alagôas steamed past Timbó, 20 canoes started from the shore full of armed Paraguayans intent on boarding her. The Paraguayans were attacking an ironclad vessel with canoes. (When this was reported in the Buenos Aires press some foreigners thought it was an absurd newspaper exaggeration. But the Paraguayans did it on more than one occasion.) The attackers were rammed or repelled with grapeshot.

=== Success: casualties and damage ===
Nevertheless the squadron had forced the passage of Humaitá. The Brazilian naval casualties were: one seriously wounded, nine lightly wounded. The casualties sustained in the diversionary land attack on the Cierva redoubt (Establecimiento Novo) were very much higher: the Brazilians under General Argolo lost 1200 men.

Some of the ironclads were severely damaged. Tamandaré received three shots in her bow and was making 6 inches of water per hour. She was obliged to beach at Tayí. Alagoas and Pará had their upper works completely carried away.

While three vessels stopped at Tayí for repairs, the others (Bahia, Barroso and Rio Grande) started upriver for Asunción. But López had already given orders for the capital city to be evacuated.

== World reaction ==
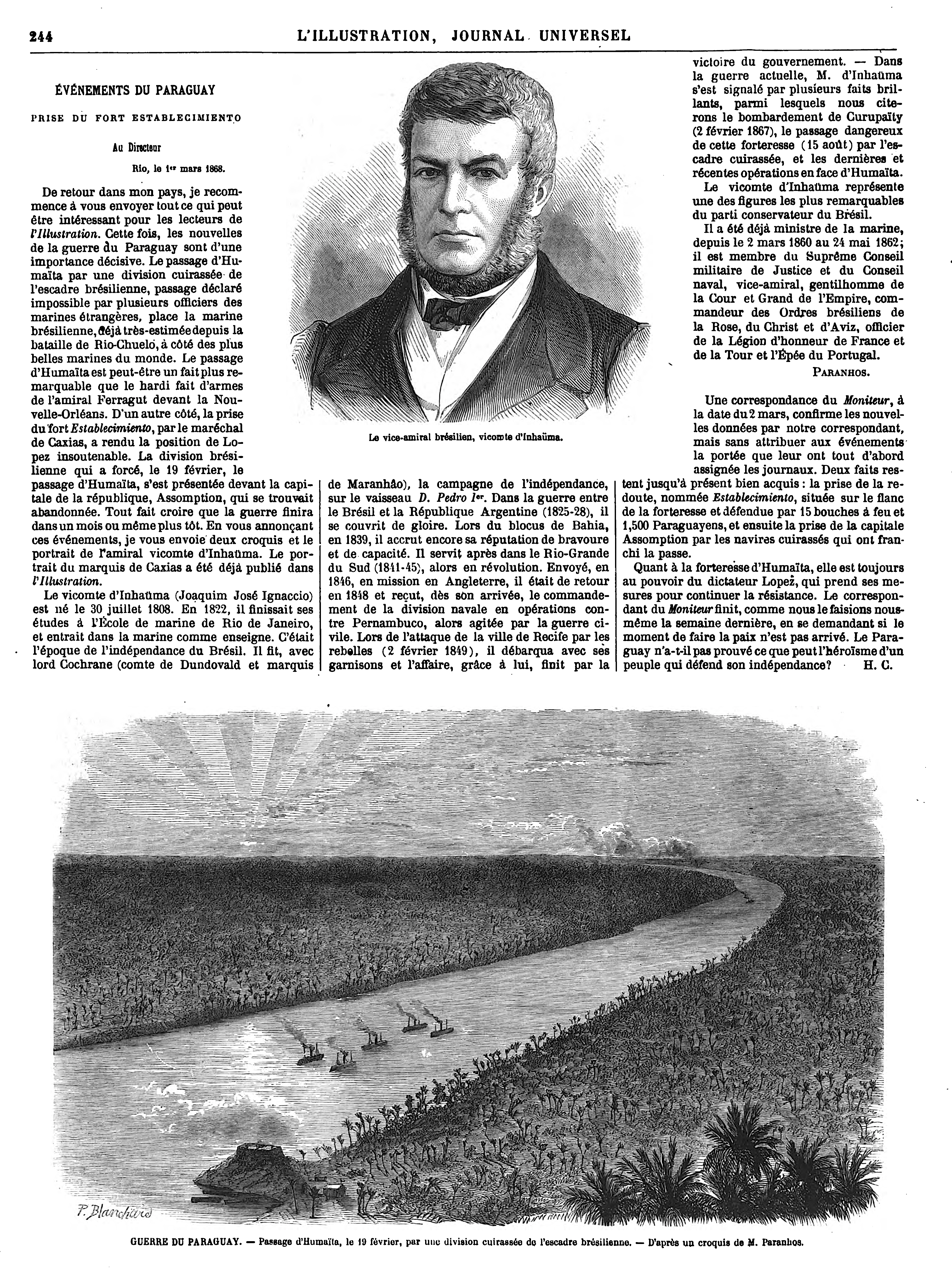
Propaganda coup in the Paris illustrated press. L'Illustration, Journal Universel, Saturday, 18 April 1868, page 244. But Inácio (top engraving) was not the hero of the Passage of Humaitá; and the bottom illustration was from a sketch by the future Brazilian prime minister José Paranhos drawn largely from his imagination

=== News impact ===
The Passage of Humaitá made news in many capitals and the reputation of the Brazilian navy was restored.

In a special edition, the Irish-edited Buenos Ayres Standard said:

The cannon of the Brazilian iron-clads, as they forced the passage of Humaitá, has re-echoed over this continent, and will reverberate through Europe. No event of equal importance has occurred in this part of the world during the present generation; and, to the high honour of the Brazilian flag, it must be said that the naval victory achieved is every way worthy to rank with Aboukir or Trafalgar… Brazil has at lasted vindicated her honour.

The article praised the bravery and skill of the Brazilian officers and men. The American minister in Rio de Janeiro forwarded a copy to Secretary of State William H. Seward.

In Rio de Janeiro the British minister George Buckley Mathew advised the Foreign Secretary Lord Stanley:

[It is] a feat that will find its place in the annals of the military and naval science of the age, and that vindicates a high standard for the courage and the discipline of the Brazilian navy.

The news reached Lisbon on 2 April and was telegraphed to other European capitals, causing a rise in Brazilian and Argentine stocks. The Brazil and River Plate mails arrived at Southampton on 6 April carrying the South American newspapers; the next day The Times of London printed extensive verbatim extracts describing the passage of Humaitá. In an era that did not yet have banner headlines, the Glasgow Daily Herald began its report across the top of the first column

THE WAR IN SOUTH AMERICA

THE GREAT NAVAL FEAT OF THE BRAZILIAN IRONCLADS

An article in the consistently pro-Paraguayan Colburn's United Service Magazine and Naval and Military Journal, of London, admitted that the Brazilian navy had

achieved what some excellent judges of such matters considered very nearly an impossibility.

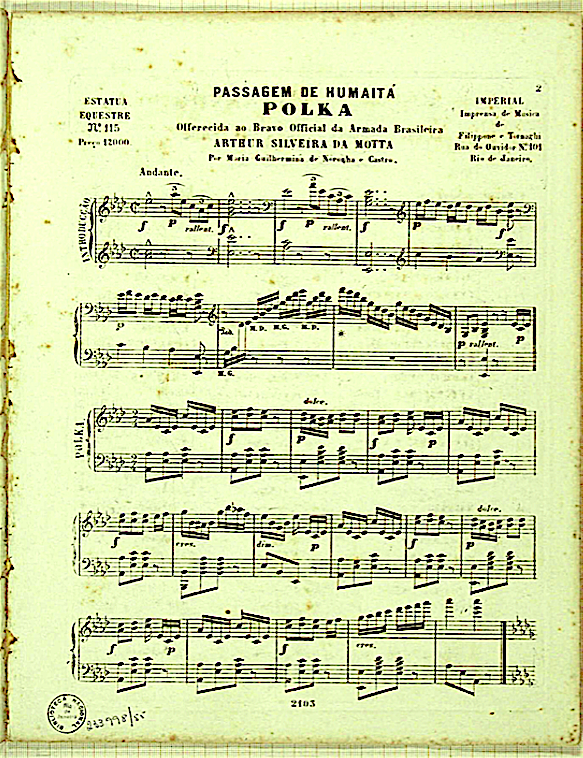
"The Passage of Humaitá (Polka)", dedicated to "the brave Brazilian naval officer Artur Silveira da Mota".

In Paris, L'Illustration, Journal Universel published a full page spread. It included an engraving of Joaquin José Inácio (now raised to the rank of Viscount of Inhaúma), a letter from the astute diplomat José Paranhos predicting the war would be over in a month, and a depiction of the passage of Humaitá, from a sketch drawn mainly from Paranhos' imagination.

=== Public reaction ===
In Brazil there was "veritable delirium". In Rio de Janeiro bands followed by cheering crowds played through the streets for three days. In São Paulo the houses were illuminated and a te deum service was ordered to be held in the cathedral. The Emperor himself thought the end of the war was near.

=== Effect on the Allies' financial standing ===
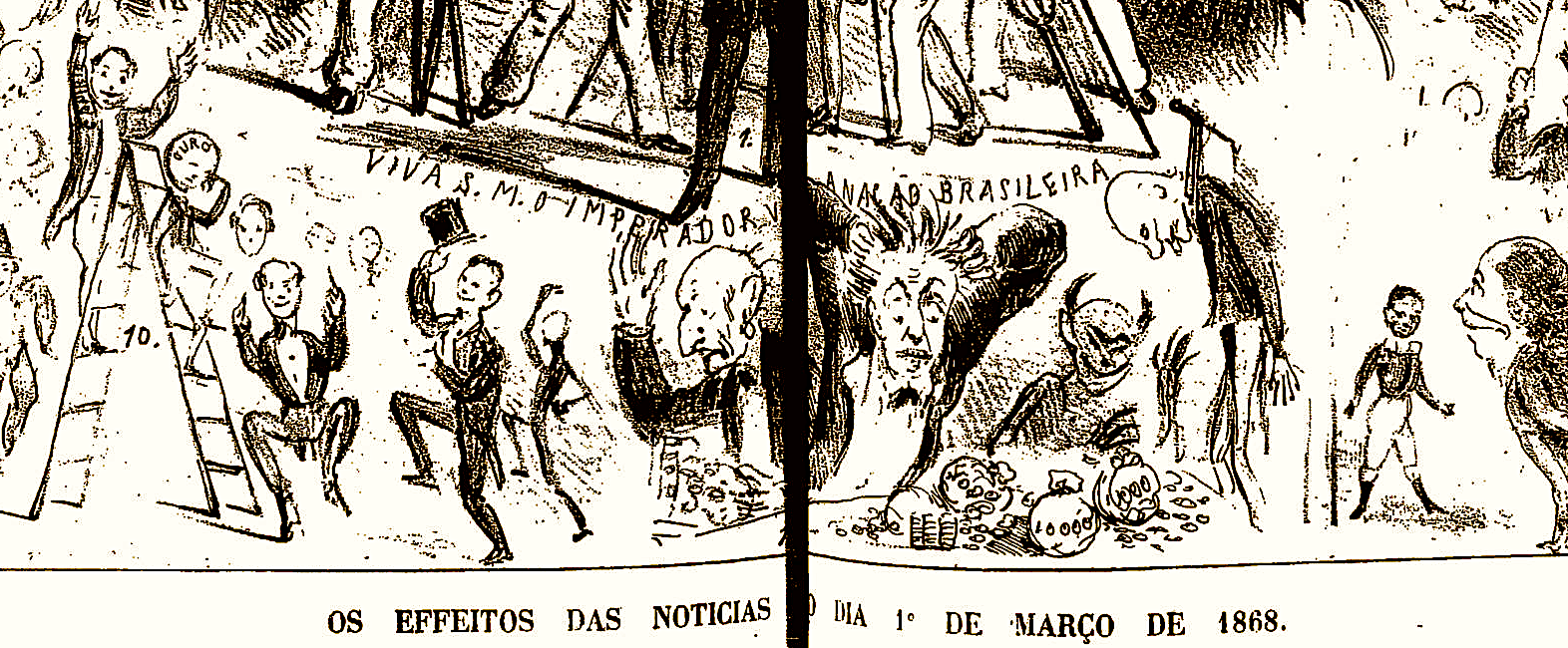
Financial impact. In this cartoon (detail) the Brazilian currency soars, gold speculators contemplate ruin and suicide.

The passage of Humaitá came at an opportune moment for Brazil's financial credit. In his official report to Parliament the British consul in Rio de Janeiro remarked that the Brazilian paper currency and the price of government bonds had dropped to half their prewar value and were still falling.

It was by a mere accident that it stopped at that point. A rise in the river enabled the squadron to pass Humaitá out of range [sic], and turned the tide of the war, raising the rate of exchange by shewing a probability of an early cessation of the hostilities.

In May 1868 Brazil, which previously had raised a loan in the City of London only by offering it to investors at a very low price, was able to float a war loan with great success, the offer being greatly oversubscribed.

Argentina – whose international credit in that era was much poorer than Brazil's, hence did not have the alternative of foreign borrowing in the first place (except for short-term finance) – enjoyed a similar boost. Whereas in 1867 she had not been able to raise a short-term loan in London at all, even on very onerous terms, in July 1868 the news enabled her to do so.

== Aftermath ==
Owing to a lack of follow-though, López with the bulk of his forces and artillery was allowed to escape through the Chaco. From thence he improvised further strongpoints on the left bank of the River Paraguay and prolonged the war to the advantage of neither side. He left a skeleton force to defend Humaitá, which was captured on 25 July 1868. Far from the war being over in a month, as Paranhos had predicted, it went on for two years.

== Historiographical appreciation ==
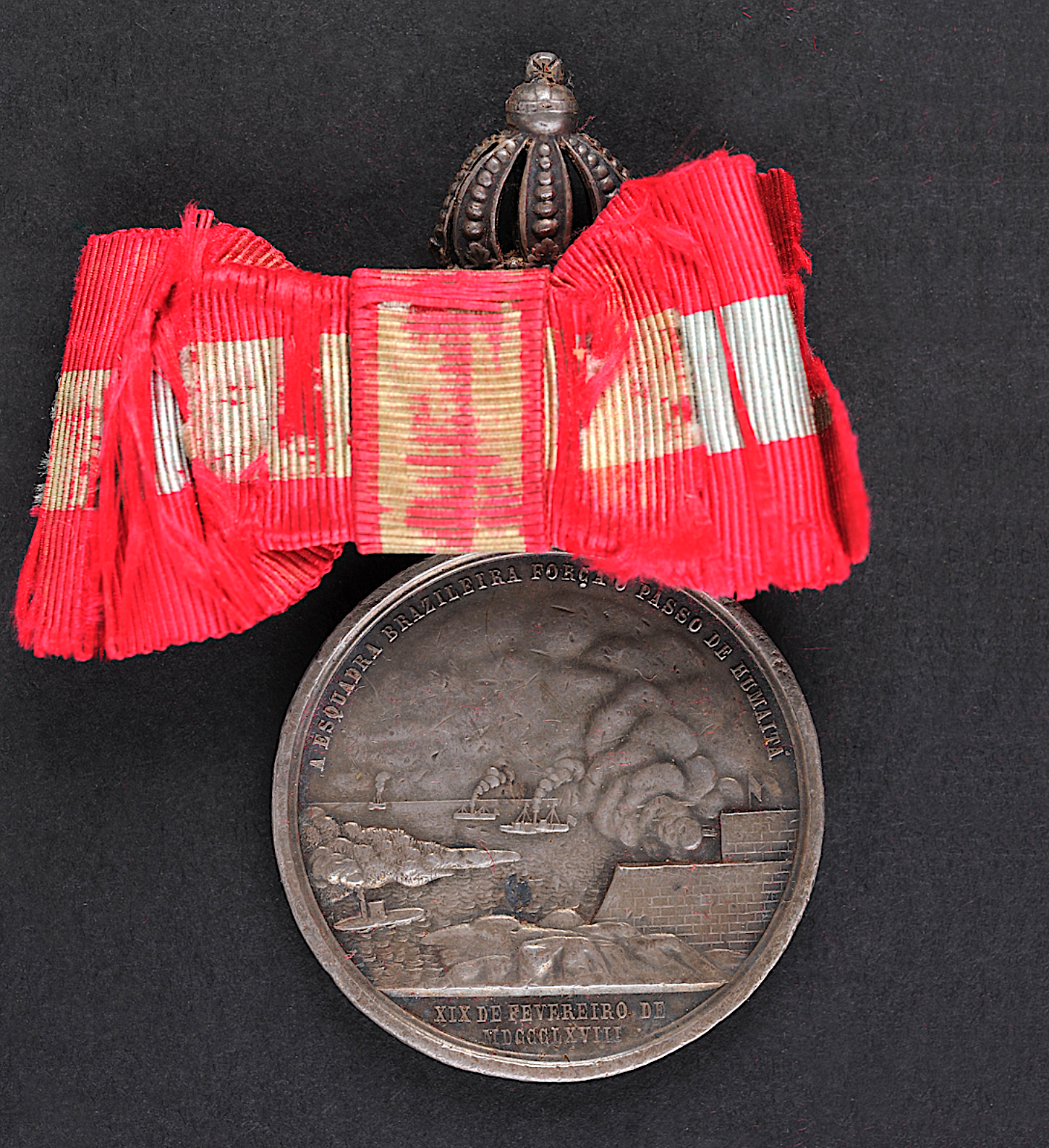
Medal awarded by Pedro II to the officers and men who achieved the passage of Humaitá. (Brazilian Imperial Museum.)

In his book Quatro Séculos de Actividade Marina: Portugal e Brasil (Four Centuries of Naval Activity: Portugal and Brazil) the Brazilian naval historian Artur Silveira da Mota considered that

Whether from a military or a political viewpoint, it was the passage of Humaitá that was the culminating naval event of the Paraguayan war. Military, because it was the principal strategic objective of the Brazilian squadron; political, because it sanctioned the right, traditionally upheld by Brazil, of free access by her shipping to the rivers of which she was a riparian superior.

In his five-volume history of the Paraguayan war the Brazilian historian Augusto Tasso Fragoso wrote that the passage of Humaitá by the ironclad squadron showed López that the loss of his stronghold was nearer than he had imagined: accordingly, he decided to retire from Humaitá with the bulk of his army and artillery while there was time.

Chris Leuchars, in his book To the Bitter End: Paraguay and the War of the Triple Alliance (2002) evaluated it thus:

The passing of Humaitá was, in retrospect, one of the most significant actions of the war. The fort had been rightly judged the major Paraguayan stronghold, and its river defenses had always been regarded as controlling and protecting the route to Asunción. It had served not only this practical purpose but also a considerable moral one, and by breaking through its defenses, the Allies could be said to have turned the tide of the war.

Likewise David H. Zook of the U.S. Naval War College wrote that it was "the culminating event of the entire war".

On the other hand in their jointly-written introduction to I Die with My Country: Perspectives on the Paraguayan War, 1864–1870 (2004) Professors Whigham and Kraay wrote that the passage of Humaitá was a feat of limited military significance.

== See also ==
- Treaty of the Triple Alliance
- Fortress of Humaitá
- Siege of Humaitá
- Paraguayan War casualties
- Paraguayan War
