= Consolidation of Pedro II of Brazil =

The consolidation of Pedro II of Brazil covers the period from his coronation on 18 July 1841 until 6 September 1853.

== Under the shadow of the Courtier faction ==
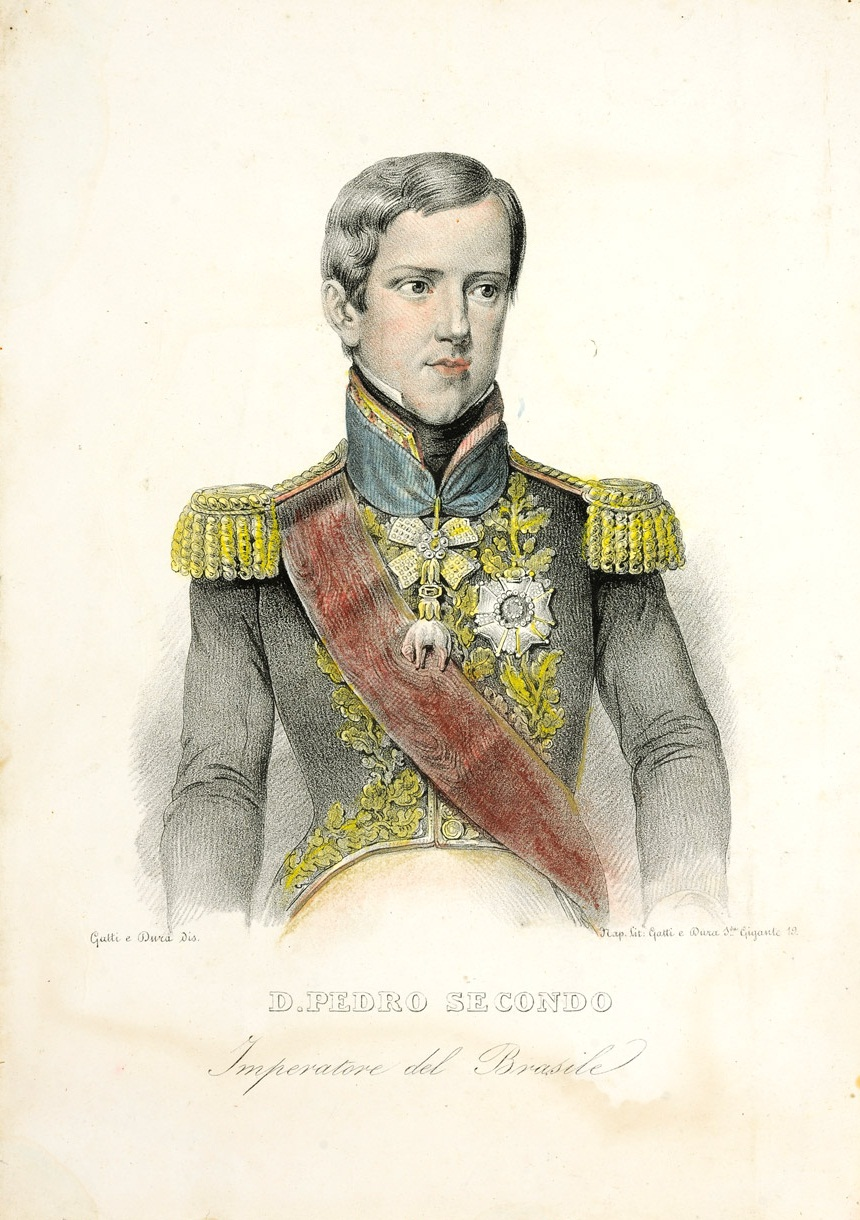
Pedro II around age 22, c. 1847.

=== Search for a bride ===
Pedro II had grown and matured by 1843. He was considered a Handsome man, at 1.91 m (6 ft 3 in) tall with blue eyes and brown hair. He had, however, two physical flaws: a protunding jaw (inherited from his Habsburg mother's family, which in the later 1840s he would try to conceal by letting his beard grow), and a high-pitched, childish voice. The "single complaint about Pedro II's behavior as monarch was his lack of social graces, and in particular his taciturnity. Since he rarely volunteered more than a word or two, maintaining a direct conversation with him was next to impossible." That, coupled with emotional immaturity, made ministers of State and courtiers expect that he would improve his behavior and character once he had married. There was also an urgent need to increase the number of heirs to the throne. The Brazilian Imperial Family was then reduced to only three people, Pedro II and his sisters Francisca and Januária (Another sister, Paula, had died in 1833 from meningitis at age 9). Januária was the heiress presumptive to the throne and held the title of Princess Imperial, while Francisca was second (and last) in the line of succession.

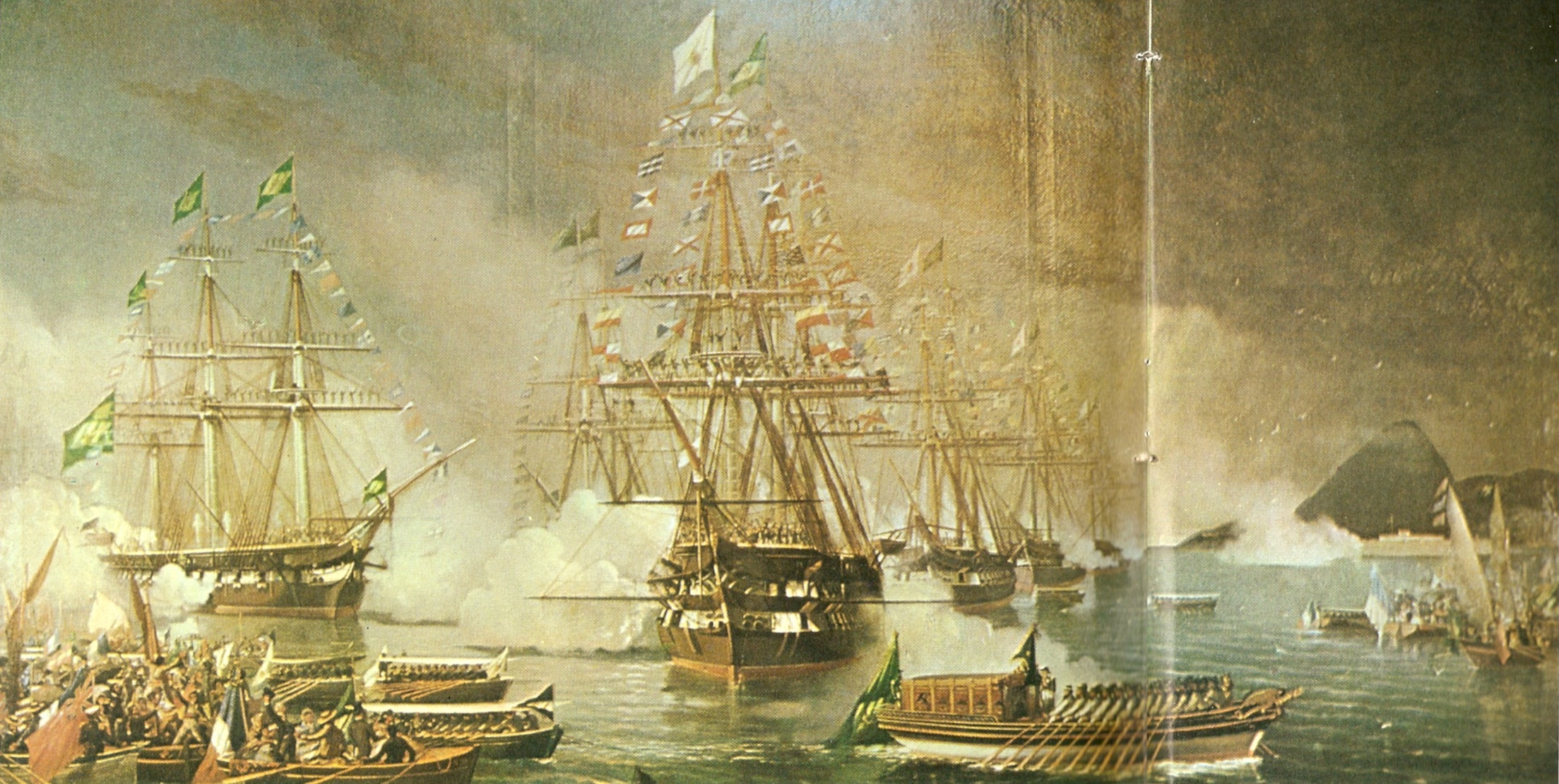
Arrival of Empress Teresa Cristina on board the frigate Constituição in Brazil, 1843.

The problem was that Pedro II, although born of one of the most illustrious royal lineages, was considered a poor marital prospect according to standards of European royalty. This was because Brazil was then a country without much political and economic importance in the international arena. The Brazilian government hoped to arrange matches with members of the House of Habsburg and asked Ferdinand I, Emperor of Austria and uncle of Pedro II, to assist in this. However, Ferdinand was mentally handicapped and Prince von Metternich was the power behind Austria's throne. Metternich was not at all interested in collaborating with the Brazilian Empire. The reason was a deep resentment he held against Pedro I (Pedro II's father). In 1834 the liberal and constitutionalist Pedro I defeated and dethroned his absolutist brother Miguel I, who was supported by the reactionary Metternich.

The diplomat Bento da Silva Lisboa (son of José da Silva Lisboa, Viscount of Cairu, councilor of Dom João VI) was made plenipotentiary minister to deal with marriage arrangements, and departed for Vienna on 12 December 1840. Lisboa remained for about a year in Vienna while being ignored by Metternich. Eventually, he met Vicenzo Ramirez, minister of the Kingdom of the Two Sicilies, who offered the hand of Princess Teresa Cristina (daughter of Francis I and sister of Ferdinand II, both kings of the Two Sicilies). Meanwhile, Metternich had changed his mind and planned to marry Pedro II to Grand Duchess Olga Nikolaevna (daughter of Russian Czar Nicholas I), but it was already too late. On 20 May 1842, both ministers signed a marriage contract between Pedro II and Teresa Cristina. The government of the Two Sicilies sent a picture of Teresa Cristina to the Brazilian emperor, and she seemed to be a beautiful young woman. The wedding occurred by proxy on 30 May 1843 in Naples, Pedro II being represented by his fiancée's brother Prince Leopold, Count of Syracuse.

=== Marriage ===
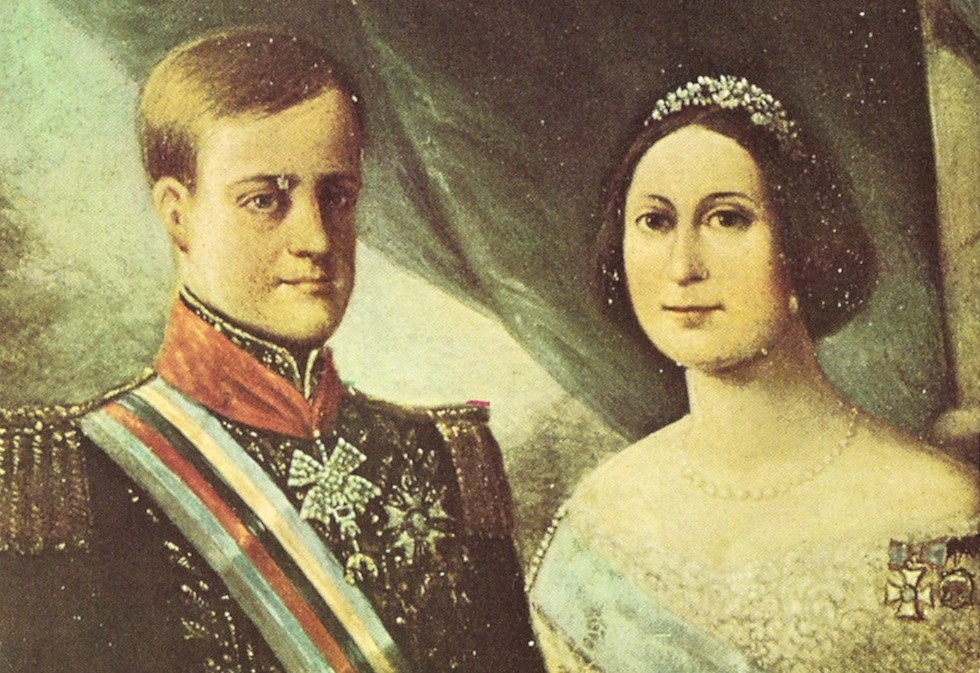
Pedro II and Teresa Cristina soon after their marriage, 1843.

A small Brazilian fleet composed of the frigate Constituição and the corvettes Dois de Julho and Euterpe departed for the Two Sicilies on 3 March 1843 to escort the new Empress of Brazil. Meanwhile, on 27 March 1843, the French frigate Belle Poule arrived in Rio de Janeiro with François d'Orléans, prince de Joinville (son of King Louis-Philippe of France) on board, who had come to ask for the hand of Francisca. Their marriage occurred on 1 May and the couple afterwards sailed for France. The Brazilian fleet, accompanied by a Neapolitan naval division consisting of a ship of the line and three frigates, returned with Teresa Cristina on 3 September 1843.

Pedro II went aboard immediately to greet his bride, but upon seeing her in person, felt greatly disappointed. The picture which had been sent to him was clearly idealized, and the real Teresa Cristina was short, a bit overweight, walked with a pronounced limp and, while not ugly, neither was she pretty. "His hopes and dreams died at that moment. His response was one of visible disgust and rejection. According to one report he turned his back on his bride, and another stated that he was so overcome that he had to sit down. […] He may have done both these things." After a while, he left the ship, and she returned to her cabin. Perceiving his disillusionment, she burst into tears, lamenting that "the emperor did not like me!" That evening, Pedro II wept on the shoulder of the Steward Paulo Barbosa and complained to the Lady-in-waiting Mariana de Verna, "They have deceived me, Dadama!" It took several hours to convince him that he could not give up. Thus, the wedding celebration occurred on the following day, 4 September.

=== Establishment of the imperial authority ===
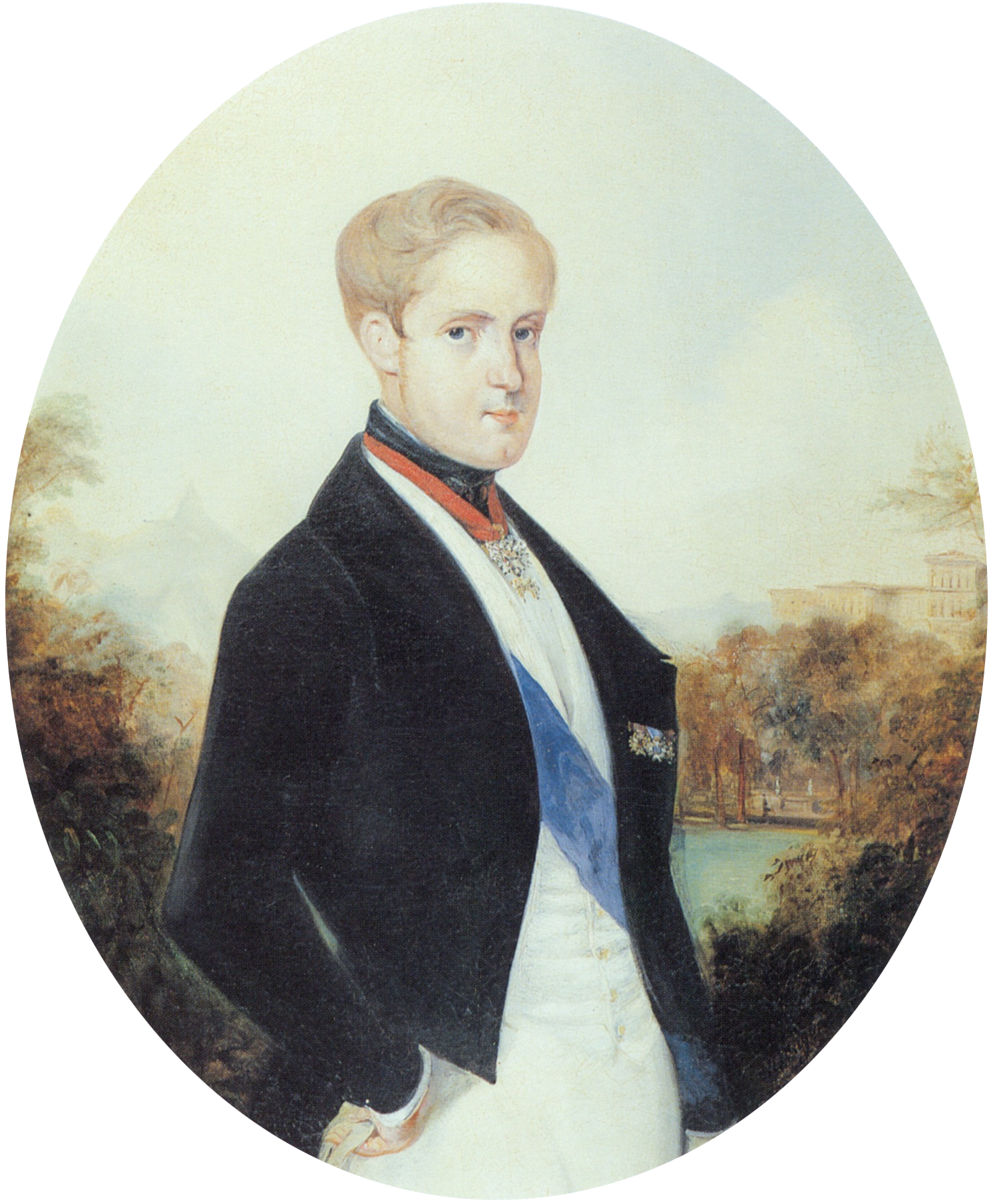
Pedro II at age 20, 1846.

Empress Teresa Cristina was accompanied by her brother Prince Louis, Count of Aquila, who married Princess Januária. The relationship between the emperor and the count soon soured. Unlike the young Pedro II, Áquila was an "extrovert with an easy charm, he valued entertainment above study and pleasure above duty." In contrast, the emperor appeared uneasy in social situations, and somewhat insecure and immature. However, the unfavorable comparison soon was eliminated. The Italian prince committed the grave mistake of attempting to acquire a more prominent position in the Brazilian court, an ambition which the "Courtier faction" found threatening to its interests. The steward Paulo Barbosa, ever vigilant against any loss of status at court, aroused Pedro II's fears and insecurities by alleging that Áquila had designs upon the throne. The relationship between the brothers-in-law became unbearable, at which point the count, tired of being mistreated by the emperor, departed with Januária for Europe on 23 October 1844. The suspicions directed towards family members exposed an insecurity and undeveloped sense of judgment which were incompatible with his position as ruler. The emperor's attention was too easily misdirected to gossip, and he too willingly believed baseless allegations of plots directed against himself. This immaturity was exploited by the "Courtier faction" which controlled access to the emperor.

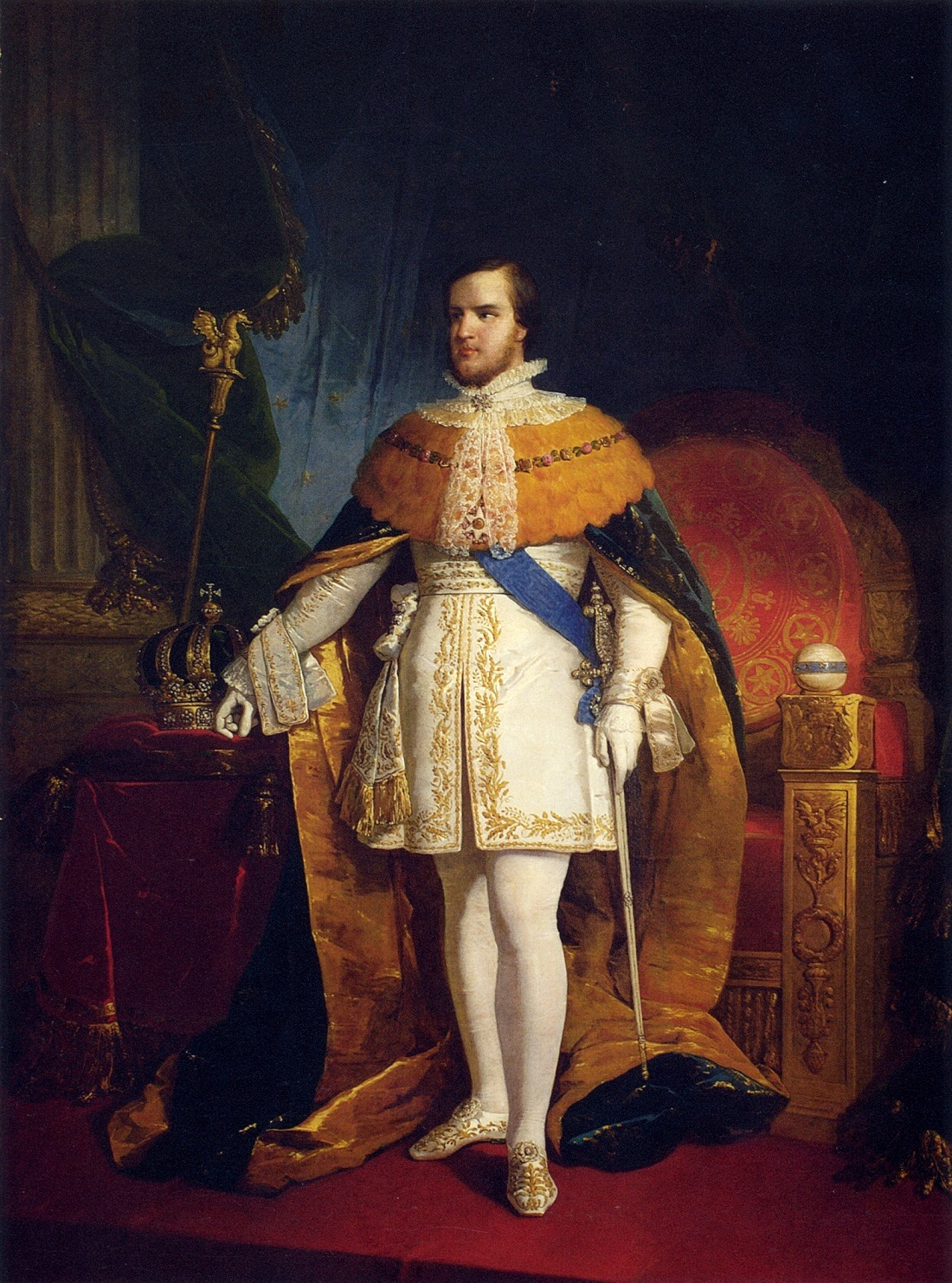
Around 1847 at age 21, Pedro II had finally established his authority as an emperor.

However, things quickly changed. With adulthood came a flowering of Pedro II's more admirable traits, and a fading of immature vulnerabilities. The emperor became more confident, courteous, and judicious. He no longer allowed others to manipulate his affairs or influence his decisions in governing, and became adroit at handling both personal and official interactions. The shy and suspicious youth became a man who could be sophisticated and charming in social situations. Pedro II "became a highly respected, even beloved, monarch whose dominance of the nation’s affairs was both welcome and unquestioned." Other positive traits flourished, such as his ability to exercise restraint. He learned to be patient and courteous, even under trying circumstances. He no longer allowed his emotions to be drawn out in public. "He was never rude and never lost his temper. He was exceptionally discreet in words and cautious in action."

Factors other than adulthood contributed to the beneficial changes: the long "Aureliano tutorship" (which allowed him to master the art of politics), the birth of his first son Afonso in 1845 (which gave him, as a father, a new opportunity to bond emotionally with another person, as well as a sense of purpose and self-worth), and finally but no less importantly, an end to domination by the courtiers. Pedro II sent Paulo Barbosa to serve as diplomatic envoy to Saint Petersburg in mid-1846. With Paulo Barbosa's influence in eclipse, Aureliano Coutinho lost much of his power and soon found himself stripped of his remaining political clout, "the result of an implicit, if unspoken, ban imposed by Pedro II." It is unknown whether the fall of the courtiers was engineered by the emperor directly, or whether he simply took advantage of opportunities which presented themselves to distance himself from their influence. There was no break on a personal level, and both men continued to enjoy friendly relationships with the emperor. The highly successful trip that Pedro II made to the southern provinces during this period improved his self-confidence and at the same time enhanced his reputation and authority. The emperor undertook to travel through areas of Rio Grande do Sul impacted during the Ragamuffin War, and his efforts were well received. The visit was met with great popular enthusiasm in Santa Catarina and São Paulo (and what is now Paraná). The populace gave many indications of their goodwill and appreciation to him for this personal involvement and concern. It became apparent during 1847 that Pedro II, at the age of 21, had solidified his authority.

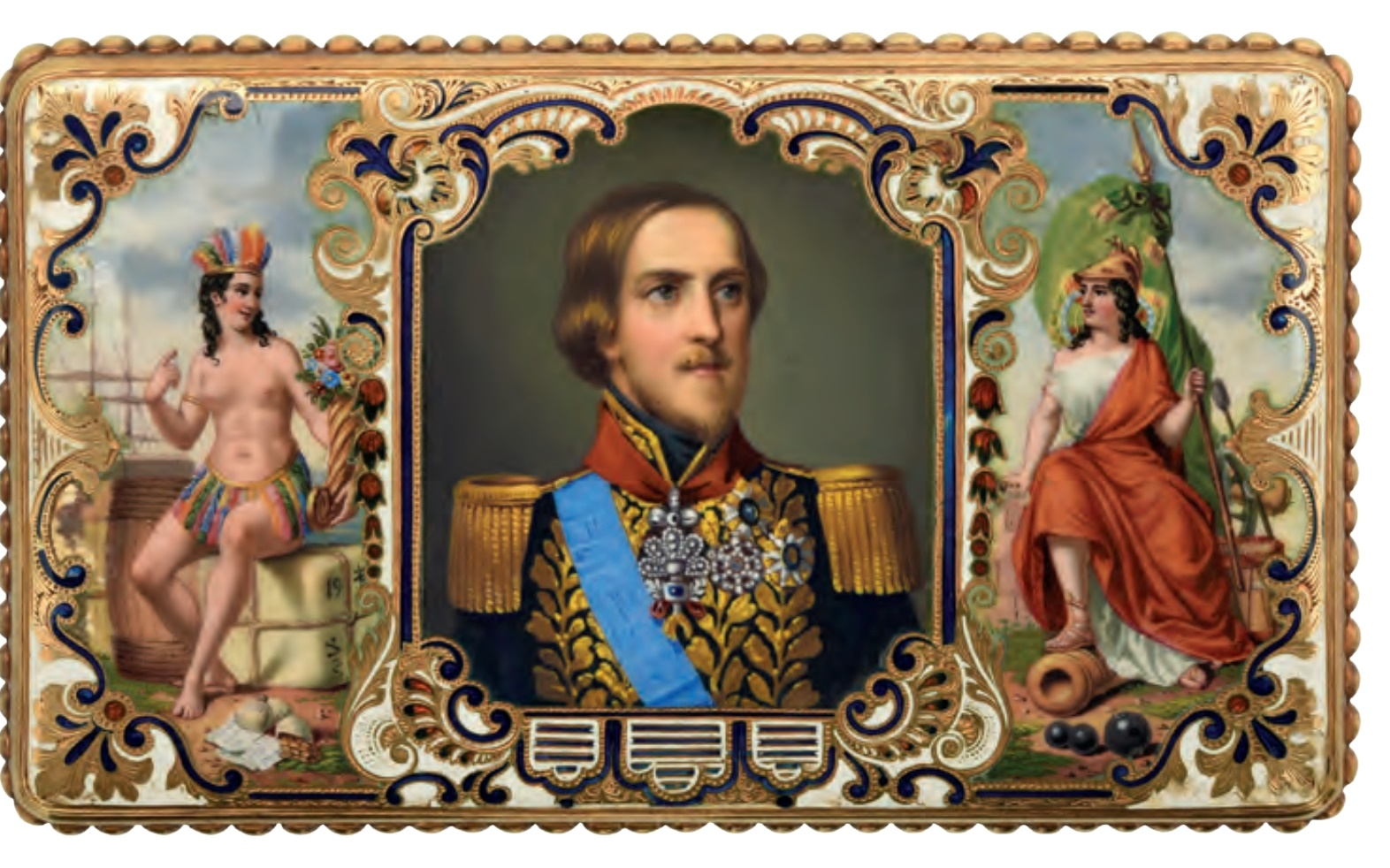
Pedro II around age 22, c.1848.
