= F42 =

F42 may refer to:

- F42 (classification), a disability sport classification
- F-42 (Michigan county highway)
- Brazilian frigate Constituição (F-42), a Niterói-class frigate of the Brazilian Navy
- HMS Laconia (F42), a Cunard ocean liner requisitioned for the Royal Navy
- HMS Phoebe (F42), a Leander-class frigate of the Royal Navy
- INS Vindhyagiri (F42), a Nilgiri-class frigate of the Indian Navy
- Obsessive-compulsive disorder
- Samsung Galaxy F42 5G, a smartphone
