= Francisco Sabino =

Brazilian politician (1796–1846)

Francisco Sabino Álvares da Rocha Vieira Barroso (1796–1846) was a revolutionary political leader of 19th-century Brazil. He was the leader of the Sabinada rebellion of 1837–38, in which he called for the abolition of slavery and the redistribution of land, but he was defeated.

== Biography ==
Francisco Sabino was a doctor from Brazil, and he later became a revolutionary political leader. He led the Sabinada separatist uprising in 1837 in the state of Bahia on the southeastern shore, where he wanted to abolish slavery and redistribute land to the people of Brazil. His rebellion was defeated in 1838, and the provincial landowners organized a court to try him. He was exiled to Beira, dying of malaria in 1846 in Mato Grosso.
