= Sabinada =

Revolt in Brazil

Date	6 November 1837 – 16 March 1838
Location	Bahia Province, Empire of Brazil
Result	Government victory; reincorporation of Bahia into Brazil.

Belligerents
Empire of Brazil	Bahia Republic

Commanders and leaders
Viscount of Inhaúma; Francisco de Sousa Paraíso	Francisco Sabino; Daniel Gomes de Freitas; João Carneiro da Silva Rego

The Sabinada (1837–1838) was a revolt by military officer Francisco Sabino that occurred in Brazil's Bahia province between 6 November 1837 and 16 March 1838. The rebels proposed the existence of a Bahian Republic of a transitory nature until Emperor Dom Pedro II reached the age of majority. Calling for the abolition of slavery and the redistribution of land, they fought against the government for one year until their capital of Salvador was conquered.

== History ==
Map of the main revolutions that occurred in Brazil before 1840.

Brazil's Bahia state had a history of rebellions, starting with the conquest of Bahia in 1798, Bahia's resistance to Brazil following the Brazilian War of Independence in 1822–1823, the Federation of Guanais in 1832, and the 1835 Malê Revolt. After the 1837 resignation of regent Diogo Antônio Feijó of the Empire of Brazil, military officer Francisco Sabino rose up in rebellion, calling for the abolition of slavery and the redistribution of land. The rebel forces were mostly disenfranchised lower-class people and escaped slaves from the southern provinces. However, the rebels received support from the knowledge of traitorous generals that shared their knowledge of the southern province's geography to the cause.

The Brazilian government dispatched forces to subdue the Sabinada revolt, but many of the loyalist troops deserted to join the rebels. The rebels took over the regional capital of Salvador, but they found little support, even from the slaves. In March 1838, Salvador was blockaded and besieged by the government, and about 1,000 people perished in the fighting. Some leaders were executed, some were exiled to remote places like Mato Grosso, and some managed to escape and fight in the Ragamuffin War for the Riograndense Republic.
