= Brazilian frigate Constituição =

Constituição is the name of the following frigates of the Brazilian Navy:

- Brazilian frigate Constituição (1826)
- Brazilian frigate Constituição (F42), a Niterói-class frigate launched in 1976
