= Praieira revolt =

- Part of the Revolutions of 1848
| Date | November 6, 1848 – March, 1849 |
| Location | Pernambuco |
| Result | Imperial victory |

Belligerents
| Empire of Brazil: National Guard | Praieiros |

Strength
| 3,500 troops | 2,800 insurgents |

Casualties and losses
| 826: 313 killed 513 wounded | 1,690: 502 killed 1,188 wounded |

The Praieira revolt, also known as the Beach rebellion, was a movement in the Pernambuco province of the Empire of Brazil that lasted from 1848 to 1849. The revolt, influenced by revolutions taking place in Europe, was due in part to unresolved conflicts left over from the Regency period and local resistance to the consolidation of the Empire of Brazil that had been proclaimed in 1822. The movement was led by radical elements of the Liberal Party of Pernambuco against the ruling Conservatives.

== Background ==
The Praieira Revolt was the Brazilian response to the series of revolutions taking place at the same time in Europe. Although they had no permanent liberalizing effect, the successful February revolution in France gave visions of a better life for ordinary people and struck a responsive chord with the Brazilians. The journalist-politician José Tomás Nabuco de Araújo recorded that "the proclamation of the republic in France shook our political world to its depths." Socialist writers such as Pierre-Joseph Proudhon and Charles Fourier, who were widely read in Brazil, gave inspiration to the Brazilians.

The Conservatives were in power between 1841 and 1845. The Liberals were returned to power once again in 1845 to form a cabinet, and managed to enact several programs: a protectionist tariff (1844), electoral reforms that extended suffrage and reduced the number of electors (1846), and the creation of a new office, president of the Council of Ministers (1847). This last act facilitated parliamentary procedure, contributed to the power of the cabinet, and consequently extended the authority of the imperial government.

== Event ==
The principal event occurred near the newspaper Diário Novo ("New Daily") which is located on the Praia Street (Beach Street) in Recife, the capital of Pernambuco and its principal port (the revolution is named after the name of the street). The radical wing of the Liberal Party of that state, also known as the "praieiros", met regularly in the premises of Diário Novo. They were committed to removing the provincial governor Antônio Chicorro da Gama and the powerful entrenched Pernambucan aristocracy that was linked to the Conservatives.

The revolt was a culmination of mounting conflicts between Liberals and Conservatives that escalated with the end of the Ragamuffin War in 1845. Under the unreformed colonial social structure that remained from the 18th century, a small group of landowners in the influential province of Pernambuco controlled most of the workable land and preferred to concentrate on agricultural products for export. Since Brazilian economy was based on slavery and sugar, the long depression in the world sugar market aggravated social and racial ills in the 1840s.

In this feudal atmosphere of enforced silence, the editor of the short-lived journal O Progresso (1846–1848), Antônio Pedro de Figueiredo, spoke out for half of the province's population that were "vassals under the yoke" and declared that "the division of our soil in grand properties is the source of the major part of our ills." Another contemporary observer maintained that the Cavalcanti family owned one third of Pernambuco's sugar plantations (engenhos). Cavalcante was head of the Conservative Party in Pernambuco and a network of kinship ties extended the family's power. A popular saying of the time went:

Quem viver em Pernambuco,
Deve estar desenganado.
Ou há de ser Cavalcante,
Ou há de ser cavalgado.

which translates approximately as:

Whoever lives in Pernambuco,
Should not be deceived.
Either you are Cavalcante (mounter),
Or you will be mounted.

The key to this saying is the witty Portuguese pun between Cavalcante (a rich family of Pernambuco, but also horse rider, mounter) and cavalgado (ridden, mounted).

The breaking point was the appointment by the Emperor of a new Conservative cabinet led by Pedro de Araújo Lima. A rebellion against the new provincial government, initiated by the "praieiros" in Olinda, began on November 7, 1848 and spread rapidly through the state. A "Manifesto to the World" calling for free and universal voting rights, freedom of the press, federalism and the end of the "Poder Moderador" (the Moderating Power – the supremacy of the emperor over the executive, legislative, and judiciary branches of the government that was instituted in the Brazilian Constitution of 1824), was on January 1, 1849. However, with only 2500 combatants, the movement quickly collapsed and was dispersed by the government forces. Other similar provincial movements swiftly followed suit.

== See also ==
- Rebellions and revolutions in Brazil

== Bibliography ==
=== References ===
- Barman, Roderick J (1999). Citizen Emperor: Pedro II and the Making of Brazil, 1825–1891. Stanford: Stanford University Press.
- Nabuco, Joaquim (1975). Um Estadista do Império (in Portuguese). Vol. 1. Rio de Janeiro: Nova Aguilar.
