= Brazilian frigate Constituição (1826) =

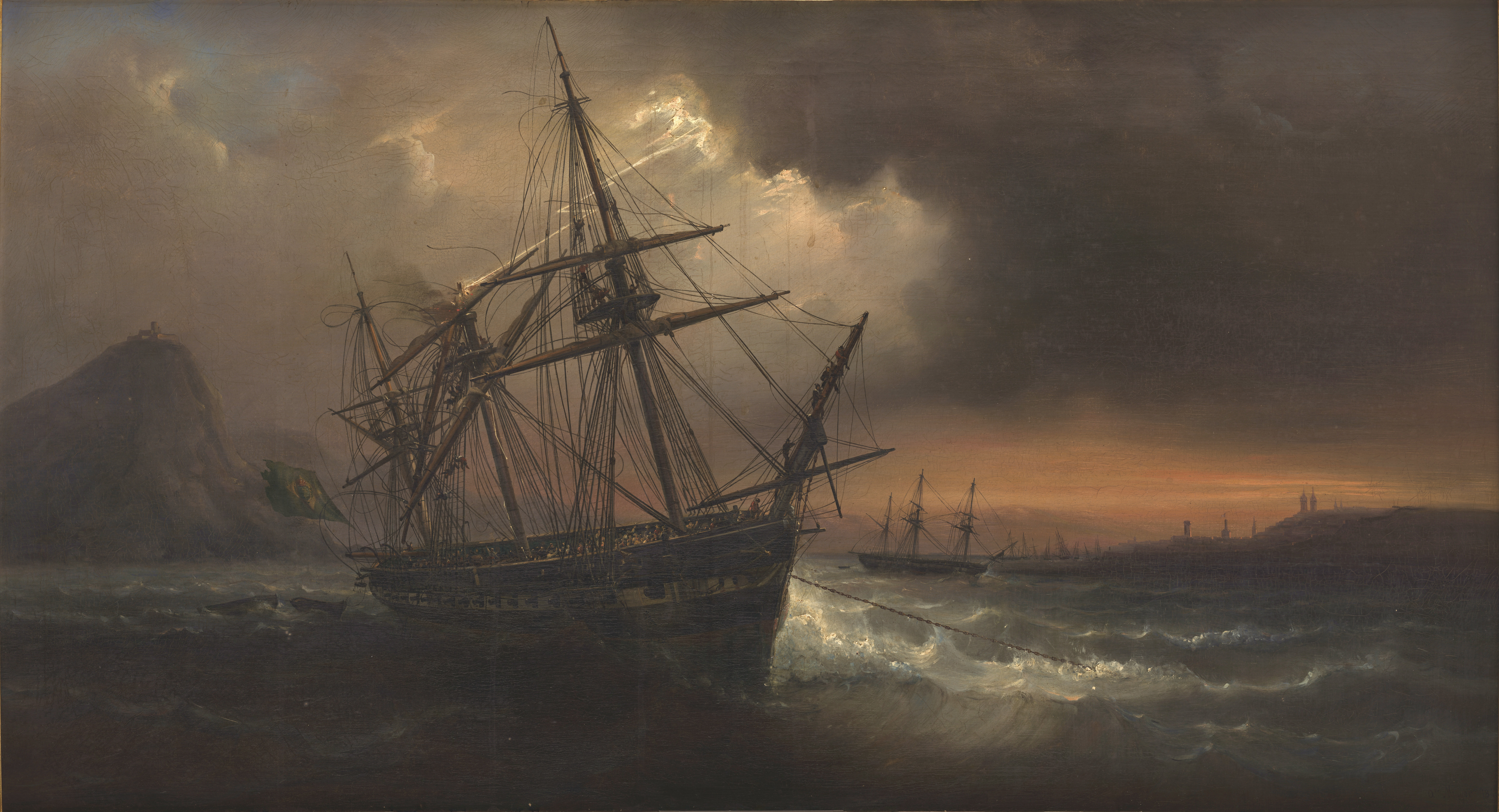
- Constituição, by Estevão Mayer, c. 1845

History

Empire of Brazil
- Name: Amazonas
- Namesake: Amazon River
- Ordered: 3 January 1825
- Builder: Henry Eckford
- Laid down: July 1825
- Launched: May 1826
- Completed: August 1826
- Renamed: Isabel Maria on 23 October 1826 and Constituição on 13 May 1831

General characteristics
- Type: Frigate
- Displacement: 1,768 t (1,740 long tons)
- Length: 53.95 m (177 ft 0 in)
- Beam: 14.02 m (46 ft 0 in)
- Depth: 9.14 m (30 ft 0 in)
- Complement: 480–570
- Armament: As built: 62 guns; 30 × 32-pounder long guns; 30 × 24-pounder carronades; 2 × 24-pounder guns

Constituição was a 62-gun frigate of the Imperial Brazilian Navy. She was built by Henry Eckford in New York in 1826. First named Amazonas, she was renamed Isabel Maria in 1826 and took part in the Cisplatine War between the Empire of Brazil and the United Provinces of the Río de la Plata.

== Design and construction ==
On 21 January 1824, emperor Pedro I of Brazil appointed José Silvestre Rebelo as Brazil's chargé d'affaires to the United States. Rebelo received instructions from Luís José de Carvalho e Melo, then Foreign Minister, to negotiate the acquisition of frigates and other ships in the United States. Rebelo arrived in Baltimore on 26 March 1824, being received by president James Monroe two months later.

On 3 January 1825, Rebelo concluded the contract with shipbuilder Henry Eckford for the construction of two frigates "in every way similar to those of the United States war navy". Each frigate should be built in Baltimore and New York and be delivered on 1 May 1826 for the price of 350 thousand pesos each, but without any guns, ammunition, and gunpowder. The Brazilian government initially deemed the price too high, to which Rebelo replied that "if a 50-gun frigate costs 500 thousand cruzados in Rio de Janeiro and a 74-gun ship of the line a million, it was clear that a 62-gun ship could not cost less than 750 thousand cruzados".

The keels of the frigates were laid in July 1825 with construction work well advanced by August. A first installment of 100 thousand pesos was paid by Brazil. In the meantime, the Cisplatine War broke out between the Brazilian Empire and the United Provinces of the Río de la Plata in December 1825. By early 1826, the Brazilian government increased the budget for the two ships by over 10,000 pounds to cover equipment and other expenses.

The ship was initially named Amazonas in honour of the Amazon River, Brazil's longest river. It displaced 1,768 tons; (Note: Or 546 tons, according to DPHDM, p. 3) measuring 53.95 metres (177 ft 0 in) in length; 14.02 metres (46 ft 0 in) in beam; and 9.14 metres (30 ft 0 in) in depth. The frigate was ship-rigged, with three masts plus a bowsprit. Its armament consisted of a total of 62 guns: thirty 32-pounder culverins, thirty 24-pounder carronades, and two additional 24-pound guns. The crew consisted of 480 men in peacetime and 570 in wartime.

Amazonas was launched in New York in May 1826, leaving the shipyard by the end of April. It set sail for Brazil under the U.S. flag and manned by an American crew in August 1826, arriving in Guanabara Bay by the end of October. It is unclear whether the U.S. government posed any obstacles to its delivery. On 23 October 1826 the ship was renamed Isabel Maria in honour of Isabel Maria de Alcântara Brasileira, the emperor's firstborn daughter with the Marchioness of Santos. It underwent minor repairs and four more guns were added. The crew was reorganized with Brazilian sailors, and command was given to frigate captain Theodoro Alexandre de Beaurepaire.

== Service ==
=== Cisplatine War ===
The Argentine government had granted letters of marque to several corsairs, mostly Americans, in order to raid Brazilian sea trade, which severely harmed Brazil's commerce. In order to protect its trade lines, the Brazilian government put many of its ships on patrol missions in the country's coastline. This included the frigate Isabel Maria, which set sail for Santa Catarina alongside a fleet commanded by vice admiral Manuel Antônio Farinha and carrying the emperor on 24 November 1826. By the morning of 29 November, the convoy spotted the Argentine corvette Chacabuco hoisting a French flag. Isabel Maria chased it at full sail, at which point the enemy ship lowered the French flag and hoisted an Argentine one, firing at the Brazilian vessel. After exchanging some fire, the two vessels disengaged at 08:00 due to unfavorable wind conditions.

On 15 March 1826, Isabel Maria spotted the Argentine brig Pampero, chasing it until it surrendered. The ship was captured and incorporated into the Brazilian Navy with the name Pampeiro. A few months later, on 8 June, Isabel Maria chased and captured another Argentine ship, the corsair Hijo de Julio, near the Cape of Santa Maria. Isabel Maria continued to operate over the course of the following years, chasing Argentine corsairs. In 1827, then second lieutenant Joaquim José Inácio embarked on the ship. On 16 April 1828 the frigate's command was assumed by John Pascoe Grenfell.

=== Post-war ===
Isabel Maria returned to Rio de Janeiro by mid-1828. The following year, the frigate set sail for Europe on 15 February, reaching Plymouth on 28 July, where it joined the frigates Imperatriz and Dona Francisca. On 30 June the fleet sailed back for Rio de Janeiro, bringing aboard emperor Pedro I's new wife, Amélie of Leuchtenberg, as well as ambassadors Barbacena, Palmella, and their entourage. On 25 November 1829, Isabel Maria departed for Brest carrying Isabel Maria de Alcântara Brasileira for Europe at Amélie's request. The ship was not able to anchor at Brest, however, due to strong contrary winds that damaged it. The frigate's commander, Guilherme Eyre, was then persuaded to change course for Plymouth, where it arrived on 8 February 1830. Isabel Maria then underwent the necessary repairs in a local shipyard.

Emperor Pedro I abdicated the Brazilian throne on 7 April 1831. A few months later, on 13 May 1831, Isabel Maria was renamed Constituição in honour of Brazil's Constitution. By this time the frigate was left in disrepair when Joaquim José Inácio was appointed its commander on 31 March 1832. The new commander sought the authorities to repair the vessel, and so the ship was sent to the Rio de Janeiro Navy Arsenal where it underwent repairs until October 1837. At this time its armament was changed to thirty 24-pounder culverins and thirty four 32-pounder carronades. That same year Constituição served as prison ship for lieutenant captain João Maria Wandenkolk and first lieutenant Francisco Xavier de Alcântara, captured during the Cabanagem revolt in Pará.

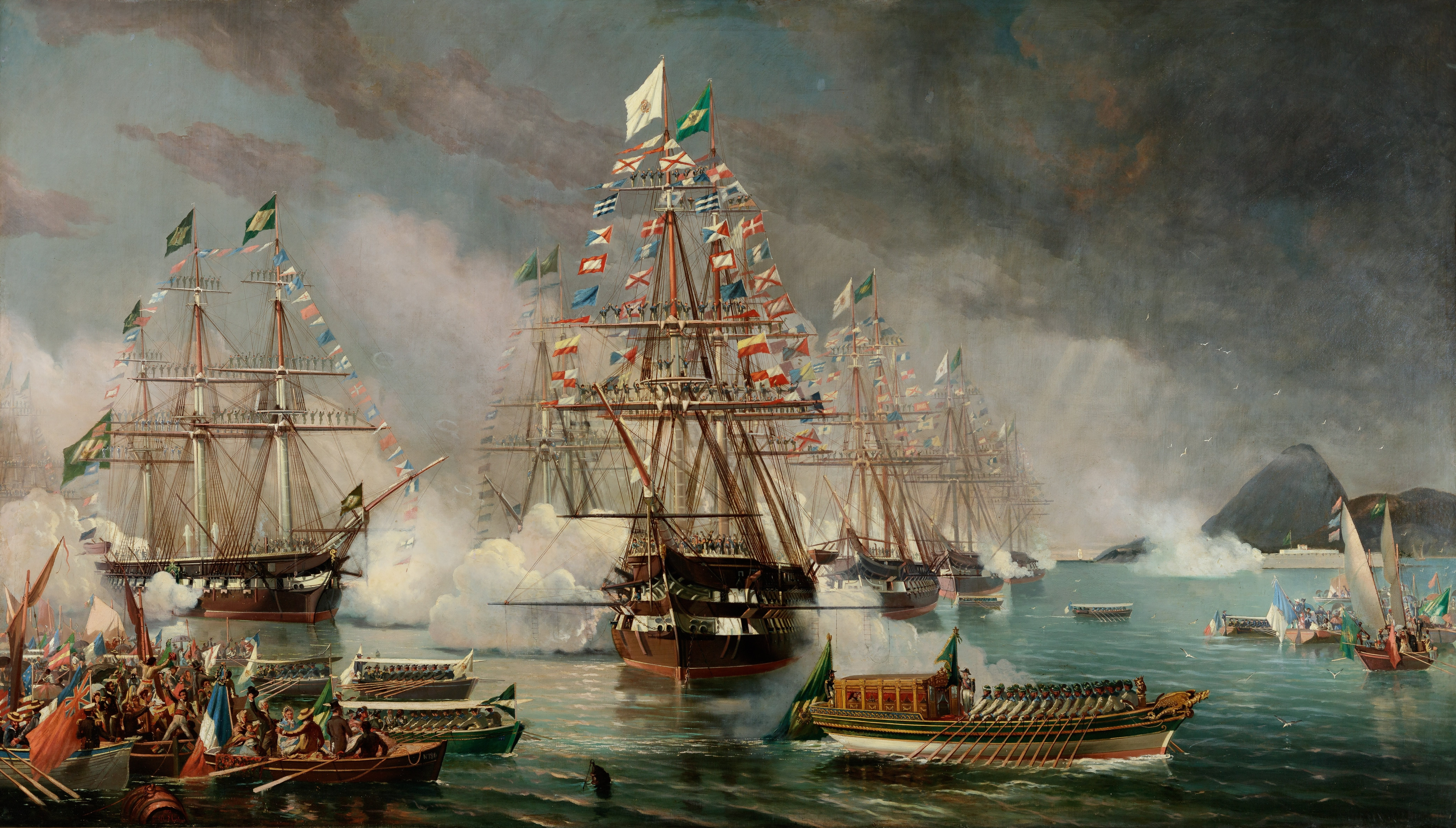
Arrival of the Frigate Constituição in Rio de Janeiro, bringing Teresa Cristina on board, by Edoardo De Martino, 1872

By 1840 the Brazilian government began organizing the fleet that would sail to Naples in order to bring empress Teresa Cristina of the Two Sicilies to Brazil. Constituição was assigned to the fleet under the command of captain of sea and war José Ignácio Maia. The frigate was richly decorated with Brazilian imperial insignia and furnished with luxurious items, such as mirrors, paintings, gold carving, and marble. The other ships of the fleet consisted of the corvettes Euterpe and Dois de Julho. The fleet departed for Europe on 5 March 1843, under the command of Theodoro Alexandre de Beaurepaire. The ships arrived in Naples on 22 May 1843. On 1 July 1843 the empress went aboard Constituição, being greeted with a 21 shot salvo. The fleet set sail for Brazil the next day, also bringing aboard diplomatic officials and the empress' maids and servants. It was escorted by the Neapolitan ships Vesuvio, Partenope, Isabela, and Amalia. The fleet arrived in Rio de Janeiro in the afternoon on 3 September 1843, being greeted by cannon salvos and the city's inhabitants. The empress disembarked with her entourage the next day.

The frigate underwent repairs and set sail on 16 October 1843, escorting the fleet that was carrying emperor Pedro II and the royal family for Southern Brazil. The fleet consisted of the corvette Euterpe, the brigs Felicidade and Pirajá, the patache Argos, the steamers Imperador and Imperatriz, and the foreign frigates Rositam (American), Cyclops and Grecian (British). The fleet returned to Rio de Janeiro on 26 April 1846.

== See also ==
- List of historical ships of the Brazilian Navy
