= Brazilian Navy Nuclear Program =

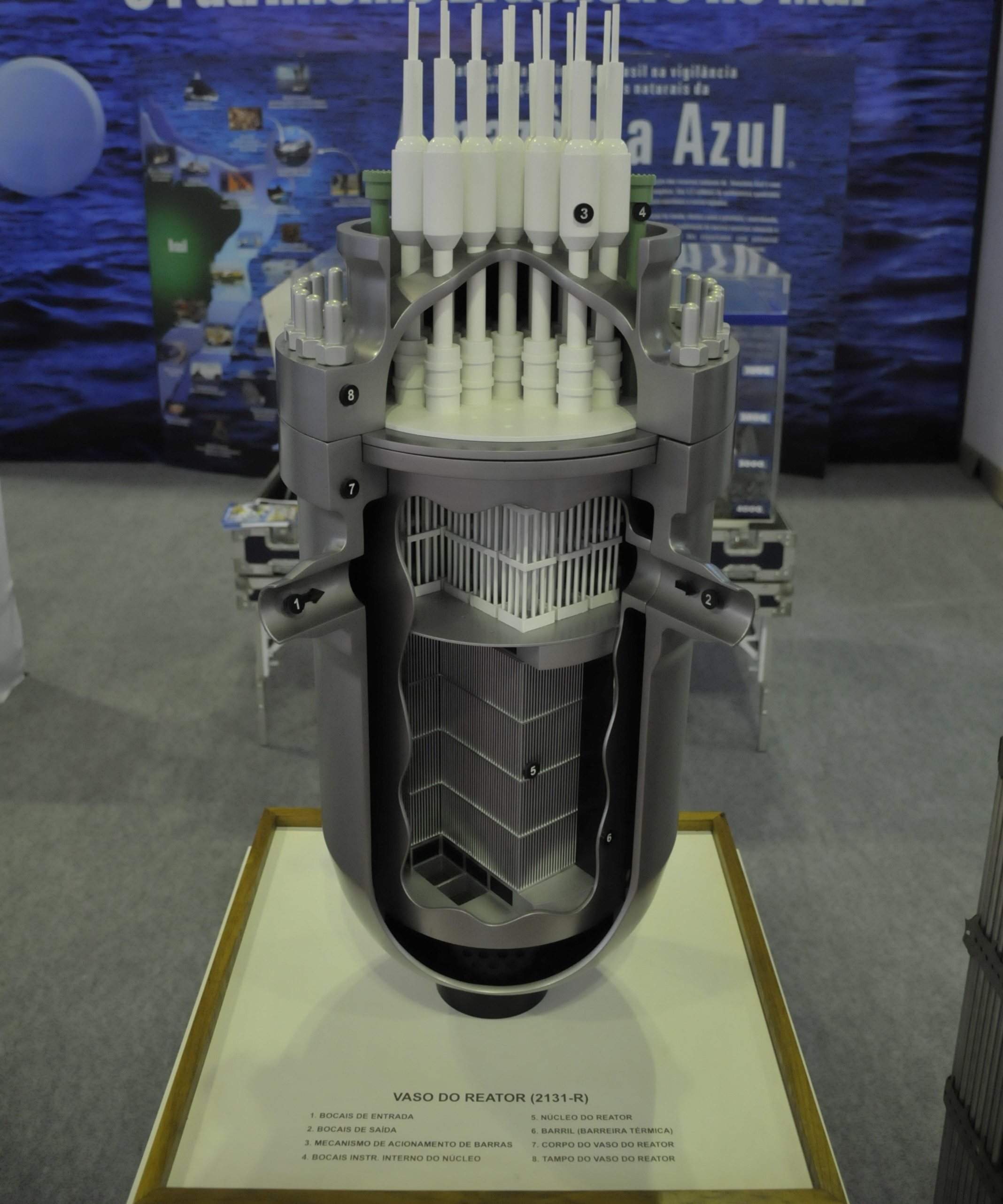
Model of the future pressurized water reactor of the Brazilian nuclear submarine

The Brazilian Navy Nuclear Program (Portuguese: Programa Nuclear da Marinha; PNM) is the Brazilian navy's initiative to master the nuclear fuel cycle and nuclear propulsion to be used in a Brazilian nuclear-powered submarine. The PNM is distinct from, but directly necessary to, the Submarine Development Program (ProSub), (Note: "[As for] the Navy Nuclear Program (PNM), it is not part of PROSUB." "The PNM and the Submarine Development Program (PROSUB) are closely connected. The feasibility of PROSUB depends on the development of the nuclear propulsion system, which is the focus of the PNM.") which will build the submarine itself. It is carried out by the Navy Technological Center in São Paulo (CTMSP), which operates a headquarters unit on the University of São Paulo campus and the Aramar Nuclear Industrial Center, in Iperó, São Paulo.

Founded in 1979 under the codename "Chalana Program", it was originally part of the "Parallel Nuclear Program" of the Brazilian military dictatorship, which was dissatisfied with the technology transfer it had been offered by developed countries. Civilian institutions and the country's three Armed Forces branches had their own projects, but only the navy succeeded in the long term. (Note: "Even though some authors have reduced the Parallel Nuclear Program to that carried out by the Navy [...] while others have described the projects developed within the nuclear field by all three branches of the Armed Forces but present only those achieved by the Navy as successes.") Under the initial leadership of naval engineer Othon Luiz Pinheiro da Silva, ultracentrifuges were obtained to enrich the first milligrams of uranium in 1982. (Note: For the early stages of the PNM, see Leite, Assis & Corrêa 2016, Martins 2011, and Patti 2021.) The project was subsidized through secret accounts and enveloped in both Brazilian and foreign espionage. (Note: For the secret accounts, see Folha de S. Paulo 2015. For CIA espionage, industrial espionage, and Navy intelligence, see Contreiras 1999, Schaffner 2017, Patti 2021, p. 119, and Kamioji 2021, p. 548.)

The program was made public after the return to democracy and maintained with varying degrees of support from the federal government. Politically, it is associated with agendas of technological autonomy, security, and international projection. In 1988, the PNM completed a research reactor and inaugurated the Aramar complex, despite an intense local anti-nuclear movement. The program was tarnished by association with the dictatorship and fears of a nuclear accident. (Note: "Popular protests demanded the shutdown of Aramar, but they failed to prevent the inauguration of the project on 8 April 1988." "The events of that day were proof that the nuclear accidents in Chernobyl and Goiânia had intensified public fear and uncertainty regarding projects of a radioactive nature. For many, the association of nuclear risks with Aramar remained inevitable—something governed by logic. Almost everything about the Navy's nuclear program was unknown." "Politically, Lula’s endorsement of the submarine program removed some of the tarnish left over from the military regime.".) In the 1990s, the government lost interest, the navy's budget took over all expenses, and the program dropped in priority and stagnated. A notable development in those years was a contract to supply ultracentrifuges to the Resende Nuclear Fuel Factory, meeting part of the fuel demand of the Angra Nuclear power plants. The dual (civilian and military) use of the technology helps explain the survival of the PNM.

The creation of ProSub in 2008 brought a solid promise for the construction of the nuclear submarine, renewed federal support for the PNM, and the institutionalization of its goals in the National Defense Strategy and other official documents. The nuclear fuel cycle has already been mastered, and the land-based prototype of the submarine's nuclear plant, called the Nuclear Power Generation Laboratory (Labgene), is under construction. The issue of international safeguards remains unresolved: Brazil has the technical capacity to enrich fissile material potentially usable in nuclear weapons, but ratified the Treaty on the Non-Proliferation of Nuclear Weapons (NPT) in 1998. However, it has not signed the IAEA Additional Protocol, which would grant more access to international inspections. The Brazilian government claims to be protecting sensitive information, and no agreement has yet been reached regarding the future fuel stockpiles of the nuclear submarine. (Note: Brazil's relationship with international nuclear non-proliferation institutions is addressed in Feldman 2006, Guizzo 2006, Kassenova 2014, Palmer & Milhollin 2004, Patti 2021, Rühle 2010, Sá 2015, and Silva & Moura 2016.)

== Background ==
=== Nuclear energy in Brazil ===
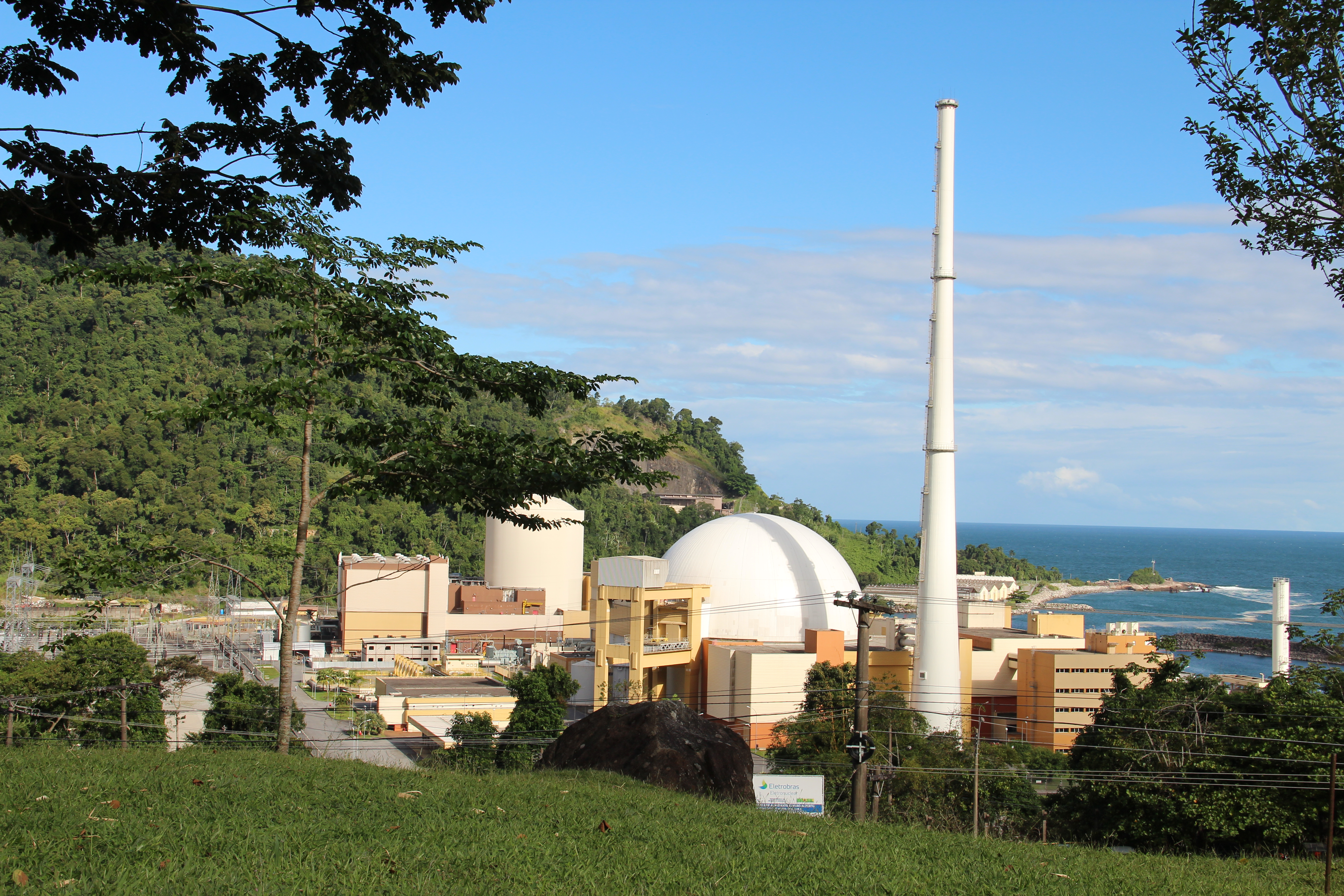
Nuclear power plants of Angra dos Reis

At the beginning of the atomic age in the 1940s, Brazil emerged as one of the main suppliers of nuclear ores to the United States. Even at that time, large unexplored uranium reserves were known to exist, which, by the early 21st century, were estimated to be the sixth largest in the world. From early on, the Brazilian government was not content with merely supplying raw materials and expressed interest in the nuclear technology held by the great powers. There were two diverging paths to acquire this technology: cooperating with the U.S., the dominant country in the field, or pursuing independent development. Initially, the prevailing stance was alignment with the U.S., to which Brazil was already aligned in the Cold War. The first nuclear research reactor in Brazil was built using American technology in 1957.

The Brazilian military dictatorship refused to sign the Treaty on the Non-Proliferation of Nuclear Weapons (NPT), created by the United States, the United Kingdom, and the Soviet Union in 1968. Its representatives at the United Nations General Assembly accused superpowers of using international security as a pretext to deny advanced (nuclear) technology to developing countries. Even so, in 1970 the American company Westinghouse was contracted to build the country's first nuclear power plant, Angra I, which would begin commercial operation in 1984. The 1973 oil crisis increased interest in nuclear energy, and in 1975 the Geisel administration signed an agreement with West Germany to build two more plants in Angra dos Reis.

The agreement authorized Brazil to import a centrifuge plant to enrich uranium on an industrial scale, but Germany's participation in the Urenco group required the consent of the United Kingdom and the Netherlands to transfer centrifuge technology. The Netherlands vetoed the transfer, and in Brazil, there were suspicions of American interference. Germany's alternative offer was to transfer jet nozzle enrichment technology, which had only been demonstrated on a laboratory scale. One of the nuclear plants, Angra II, would begin operation in 2001, but the jet nozzle method was a failure. Its contracts would be dissolved in 1988 and the equipment and machinery destroyed in 2001.

Brazil depended on enriched uranium from the U.S., a source threatened by the Nuclear Non-Proliferation Act passed by the United States Congress in 1978. Exports would only be allowed to countries that accepted full safeguards on their nuclear materials. Brazil was one of the targets of the legislation; international non-proliferation experts feared that the country—due to its great-power aspirations, authoritarian government, rivalry with Argentina, and insistence on its right to develop military explosives for peaceful purposes—might use its nuclear energy program to conceal a weapons program, as India had done.

Under pressure from the U.S. and the International Atomic Energy Agency (IAEA), Brazil signed a safeguards agreement with the latter covering the nuclear infrastructure it would receive from Germany. Facilities outside the program were exempt. Domestically, the Brazil–Germany nuclear agreement was criticized by liberal economists and hydroelectric energy lobbyists. A Parliamentary Inquiry Commission (CPI), created in 1978 to examine the agreement, served as a platform for the "autonomists" to question the jet nozzle method, past nuclear cooperation with the U.S., and the sidelining of national scientists in the program's direction. The CPI concluded, nonetheless, that the agreement was necessary for energy production. Dissatisfaction with its results would later motivate a separate uranium enrichment program, in which the navy would participate.

=== Nuclear science in the Navy ===
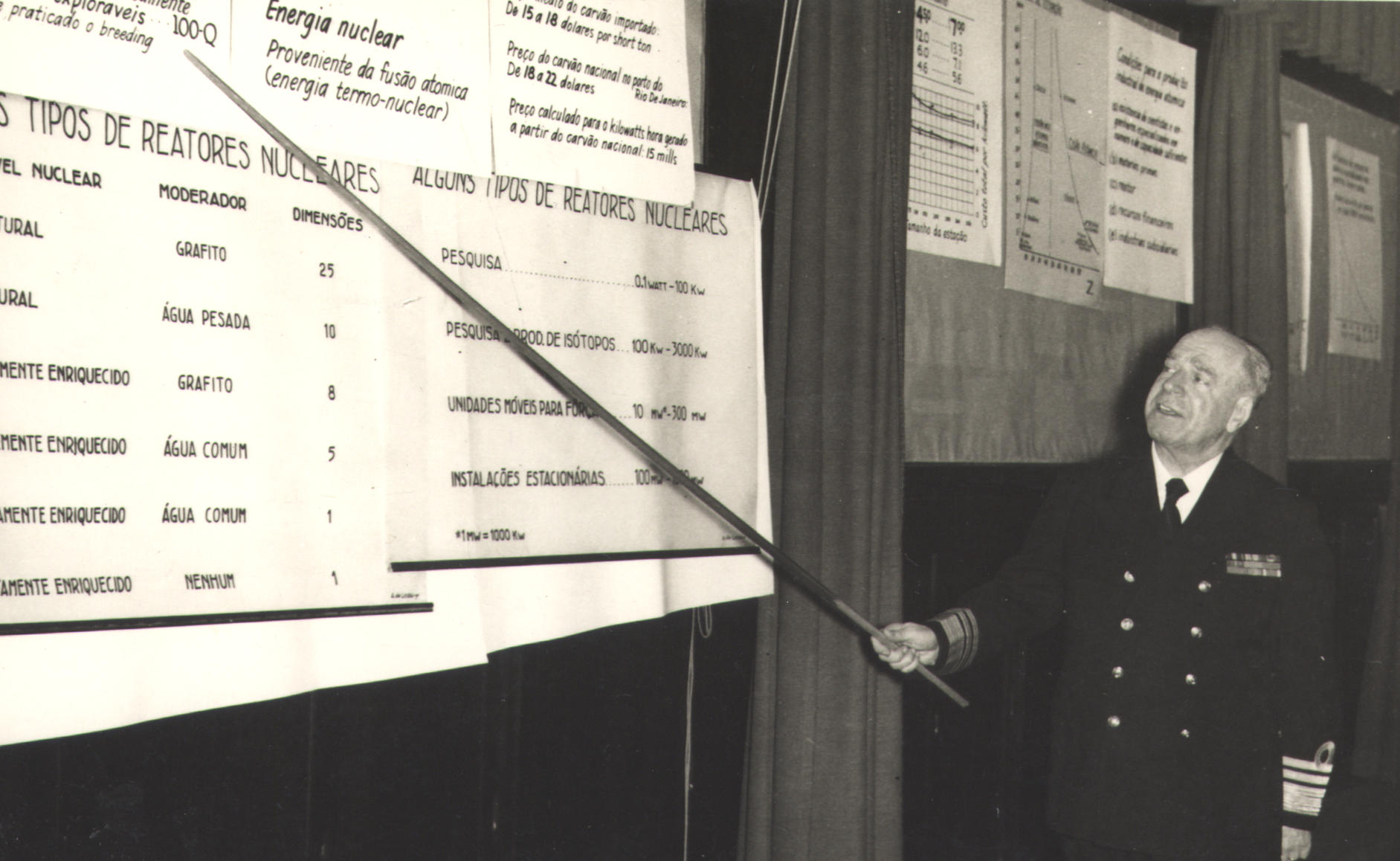
Admiral Álvaro Alberto, president of CNPq, in 1951

The Brazilian nuclear program has been linked to the military since its inception, as in other sectors of science and technology, such as aeronautics, engineering, and telecommunications. The common ideology across all these sectors was development through industrialization, and their method, a military-technocratic alliance. The Brazilian Navy in particular became one of the main actors in the Brazilian nuclear field, in a connection that begins with Vice Admiral and naval engineer Álvaro Alberto da Mota e Silva (1889–1976). His name was given to the power plant complex in Angra dos Reis—the Almirante Álvaro Alberto Nuclear Center—and to the future nuclear submarine Álvaro Alberto. Alberto presided over the first two meetings of the United Nations Atomic Energy Commission in the 1940s and, in the following decade, Brazil's National Research Council (CNPq), then the leading agency in Brazil's nuclear sector. His vision for the country's nuclear future aligned with nationalist political sectors.

==== Strategic orientation ====
The use of nuclear energy in naval propulsion was considered as early as 1954, when the professional journal Revista Marítima Brasileira published a translation of an article by American officer E. B. Roth on the United States Navy's nuclear submarine program. The first vessel of this kind in the world, the USS Nautilus, would enter service the following year. At the time, the Brazilian Submarine Flotilla used conventional (diesel-electric) propulsion, which offers inferior performance. Brazilian submarines were surplus American World War II boats. Their operational concept fit within the collective defense of the Western Hemisphere as an auxiliary to the U.S. Navy, favoring anti-submarine warfare at the expense of the classic submarine role of denying sea use to the enemy.

Before concrete interest in nuclear propulsion emerged in the 1970s, the fleet commissioned new submarines of European origin and broadened its range of missions. Foreign policy took on a more "north-south" and less "east-west" orientation, while domestic policy turned its attention to resources in the territorial sea. A new generation of strategic thinkers, such as officers Mário César Flores and Armando Vidigal, proposed a greater focus on national over collective interests. Another concern was to escape external technological dependence.

In this context, nuclear submarines, with their stealth, autonomy, and speed, seemed attractive options for coastal defense. Navy Minister Adalberto de Barros Nunes brought up the topic in a lecture at the Naval War College on October 26, 1973. He proposed that his successors begin technical studies to build a nuclear submarine and build or acquire a helicopter carrier, both of which were to be budget priorities. A 1975 document from the War College (ESG) mentions both "projects under study destined to have a major impact".

==== Precursor measures of the PNM ====
The Brazilian government requested the navy's opinion on nuclear propulsion for the first time in 1976, when it was offered by German negotiatiors. It would not necessarily be for a submarine; the proposal was for an oceanographic research vessel. According to Paulo Nogueira Batista Jr., president of Nuclebrás, "the German interest is explained by the limitations in this field to which the FRG [Federal Republic of Germany] is subject in its own territory, as a result of the 1954 Paris Agreements". The talks, which had no outcome, went beyond what the agreement allowed, as any military use of the technological cooperation was forbidden. On 15 July 1976, Navy Minister Geraldo Henning informed president Ernesto Geisel that his service's participation in the nuclear program should, for the moment, be limited to acquiring knowledge, but that it was possible to consider nuclear propulsion in warships. Brazilian officers even inspected the German nuclear-powered cargo ship Otto Hahn, but concluded that it would be too expensive to operate and the submarine would take a long time to enter service.

Technologies used in the British Churchill-class nuclear submarines were reportedly offered by the president of Vickers-Armstrongs to Admiral Eddy Sampaio Espellet, Director-General of Navy Materiel, in 1976. According to Espellet's account, upon returning to Brazil, he informed the Navy Minister of the matter and recommended sending a naval engineer to the nuclear engineering course at the Massachusetts Institute of Technology (MIT). The suggestion was endorsed by the minister and by President Geisel himself, and the chosen officer was Commander Othon Luiz Pinheiro da Silva. In the decades that followed, Othon would come to be known as the "father" of the uranium enrichment and nuclear submarine programs, the most prominent figure in Brazil's nuclear program after Admiral Álvaro Alberto.

== Creation ==
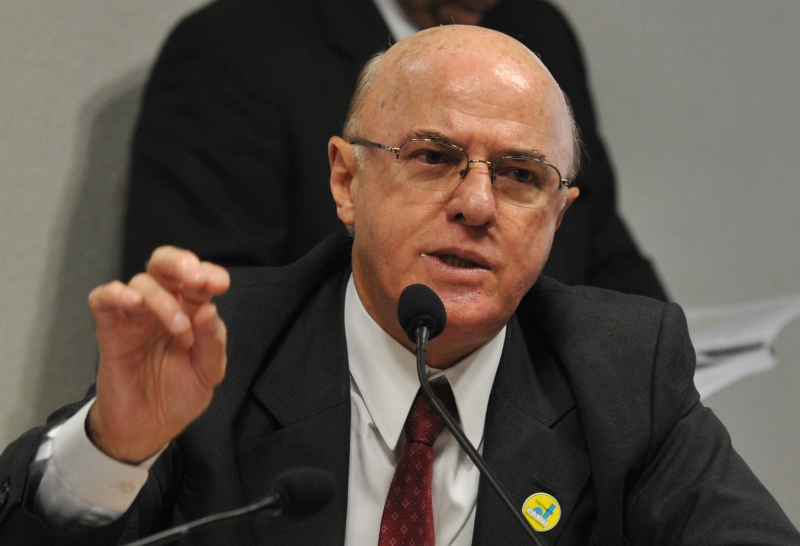
Admiral Othon Luiz Pinheiro da Silva, seen here in 2011, was the program's first director

Once back in Brazil, Othon was assigned to the Directorate of Naval Engineering, where he prepared a report on the prospects of achieving naval nuclear propulsion in the country. His proposal was for an exclusively national effort to master the nuclear fuel cycle and then the propulsion system. In his recollection, the original proposal was only to obtain nuclear propulsion, "but I thought that if we're going to develop the submarine, we might as well also develop the fuel for power plants". For him, the failure of the agreement with Germany was fortuitous, because "having power plants without the fuel cycle is like having a car without gasoline". Impressed with the report, his superior, Admiral Maximiano da Fonseca, forwarded it to the Navy General Staff (EMA), where it received a favorable opinion from the deputy chief of strategy, Admiral Mário César Flores. The document reached the Navy Minister in December 1978. In the last week of the year, the admiralty approved the decision to move forward with the nuclear submarine program.

The navy's desire for a modern vessel that would enhance its strategic capabilities aligned with the government's ambitions for prestige and development, at a time when government intervention in science and technology was at its peak in Brazil. The naval nuclear project was included along with other civil and military research efforts within the Autonomous Nuclear Technology Program (PATN), later nicknamed the "Parallel Nuclear Program". The PATN, established in 1979, was secret and immune to the international safeguards and inspections to which the "official" nuclear program organized under the Brazil–Germany agreement was subject. Its proponents were convinced nuclear development would need to be free from both internal and external criticism. By pressuring the Brazilian dictatorship on human rights and non-proliferation, the U.S. government under Jimmy Carter helped push the Brazilian program into secrecy.

Within the PATN, each branch of the Armed Forces had its own objective: the Brazilian Army aimed to build a graphite reactor for plutonium production (Project Atlântico) and the Brazilian Air Force (FAB) sought laser enrichment (Project Solimões). The navy initially sent Commander Othon to the FAB project in March 1979 to serve under Colonel José Albano do Amarante. After that officer's death, Othon concluded laser enrichment "would yield no practical results in a twenty-year horizon" and recommended to the EMA, in mid-1979, to pursue ultracentrifugation. (Note: The additional reasons for the choice were that ultracentrifugation can be implemented in parts, in series or in parallel, and is more efficient in electricity consumption than its commercial competitor, gaseous diffusion. The link between the Navy and Air Force programs was formally maintained until August 1982.) This would then be developed by the navy under Project Cyclone. The naval propulsion system itself would be Project Remo (Oar). In the words of Maximiano da Fonseca, who headed the Navy Ministry from 1979 to 1984, this program would use "exclusively national effort, in order to avoid any obstacle posed by signed treaties and agreements". In addition to the military projects, the National Nuclear Energy Commission (CNEN) oversaw civilian nuclear research.

While the navy sought naval propulsion, the army continued previous research potentially useful for the development of nuclear weapons, and the air force was developing conventional explosives, ostensibly for peaceful purposes. Among Brazilian historians, there is no consensus as to how far plans went to equip the country with nuclear weapons. Documentary evidence shows that some military sectors were in favor, but there was no political decision in that direction; in any case, nuclear armament was not the navy's objective. Among the military projects, the Navy's program was the one that achieved the best results, to the point that some authors treat the Navy Nuclear Program and the Parallel Nuclear Program as synonyms. This can be explained by better funding, clear definition of objectives, concentration of efforts, alignment with military needs and the choice of a well-established method of uranium enrichment.

== Organization ==
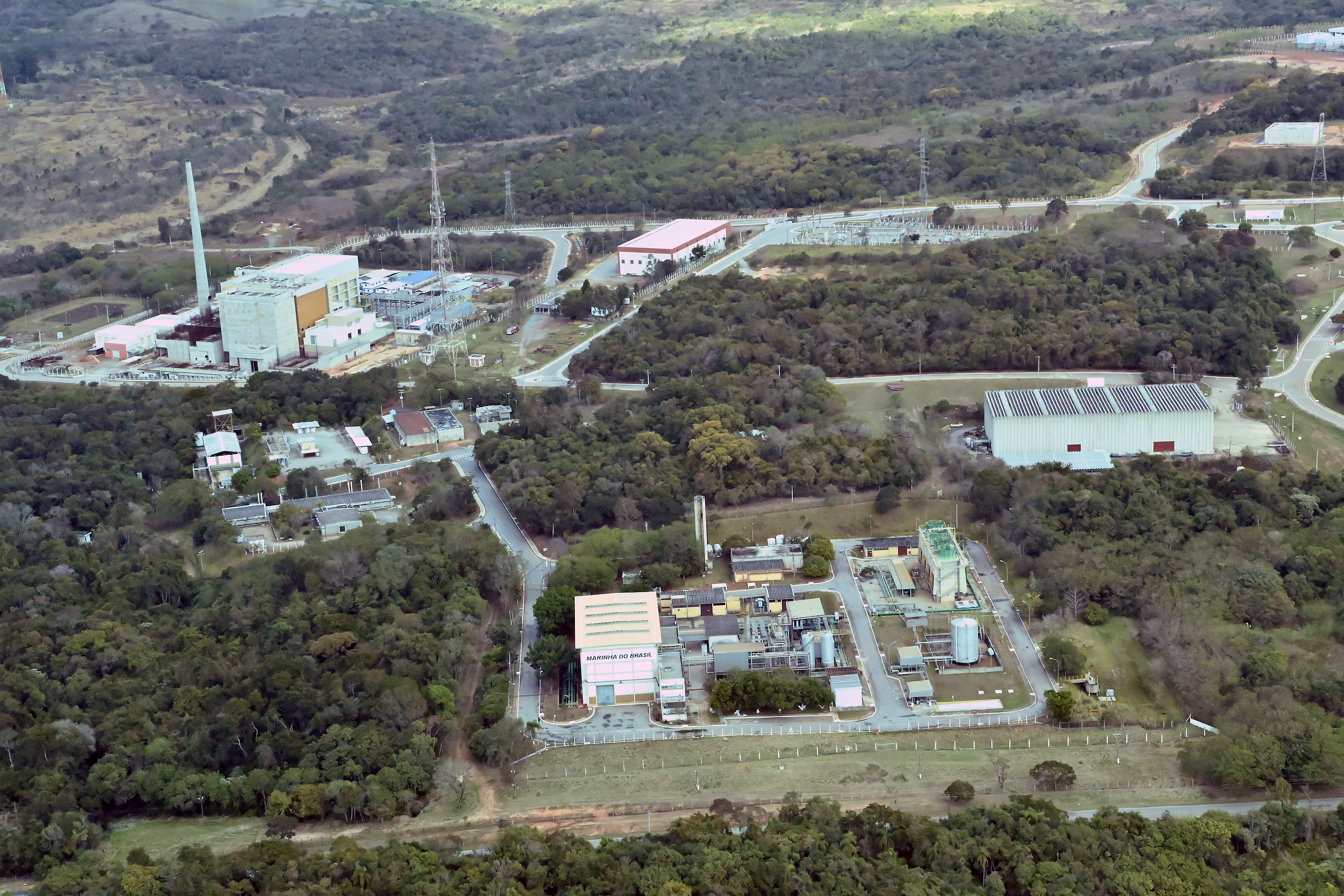
Aerial view of the Aramar complex

The PATN was linked to the President of Brazil and supervised by the National Security Council (CSN) through a General Secretariat. It included the CNEN and the ministries of the Navy, Army, and Air Force, to which civilian institutions such as the Institute for Energy and Nuclear Research (IPEN) were affiliated. The military projects were autonomous but shared information. In 1990, the CSN was dissolved, and the PATN came under the supervision of the Secretariat for Strategic Affairs of the Presidency. The Secretariat was abolished in 1998, and the PATN was merged into the Scientific and Technological Nuclear Program of the Ministry of Science and Technology.

Within the navy, at first there was no research center to carry out the nuclear projects, but only a group under Othon's leadership. The team began with just seven engineers, an informal environment, and almost no funding. The project was established on the campus of the University of São Paulo (USP) and incorporated civilian personnel through an agreement with IPEN. The navy already had close ties with São Paulo's scientific and academic community and was able to take advantage of the agreement maintained by IPEN with the Aerospace Technical Center (CTA), where Othon had worked on the laser enrichment project. Another important factor was IPEN's exclusion from international restrictions, as it was not subordinate to Nuclebrás.

On 17 October 1986, the Navy created a department to manage the nuclear program, the Office for Special Projects (COPESP), which retained its facilities at USP. For the project to evolve beyond the laboratory scale, a dedicated nuclear complex was needed. In May 1985, it was decided to install the future reactor at the future Aramar site, in the municipality of Iperó, near Sorocaba. The location was chosen for its proximity to the universities of São Paulo and Campinas. The Aramar Experimental Center (CEA) was inaugurated in 1988. Admiral Othon left the project in 1994, having completed his military service, (Note: Othon would not return to Aramar until 2007, during President Lula's visit.) and was succeeded by Arlindo Vianna Filho.

In 1995, COPESP was renamed the Navy Technological Center in São Paulo (CTMSP), charged with mastering the technological, industrial, and operational processes of the nuclear facilities required for naval propulsion. This organization has two units: CTMSP Headquarters, which remains within USP, and the Aramar complex. In 2012, the latter comprised the Pilot Unit for UF6 Production (Usexa), the Isotopic Enrichment Laboratory (LEI), the Pilot Enrichment Unit (Uside), the Nuclear Materials Laboratory (Labmat), the Nuclear Power Generation Laboratory (Labgene), the Nuclear Materials Storage Facility (Armar), and the Pilot Hot Cells Unit (UCQP). To support Labgene, in 2017 there were laboratories for Propulsion Equipment Testing (Latep), Shock, Vibration, and Noise (Labchoque), Measurement and Calibration (LAC), Thermohydraulics (CTE-150), Neutronics (the IPEN/MB-01 reactor), and Nuclear Instrumentation and Fuel Development (LADICON), as well as a Precision Mechanical Workshop (Ofmepre) and the Aramar Nuclear Instruction and Training Center (CIANA).

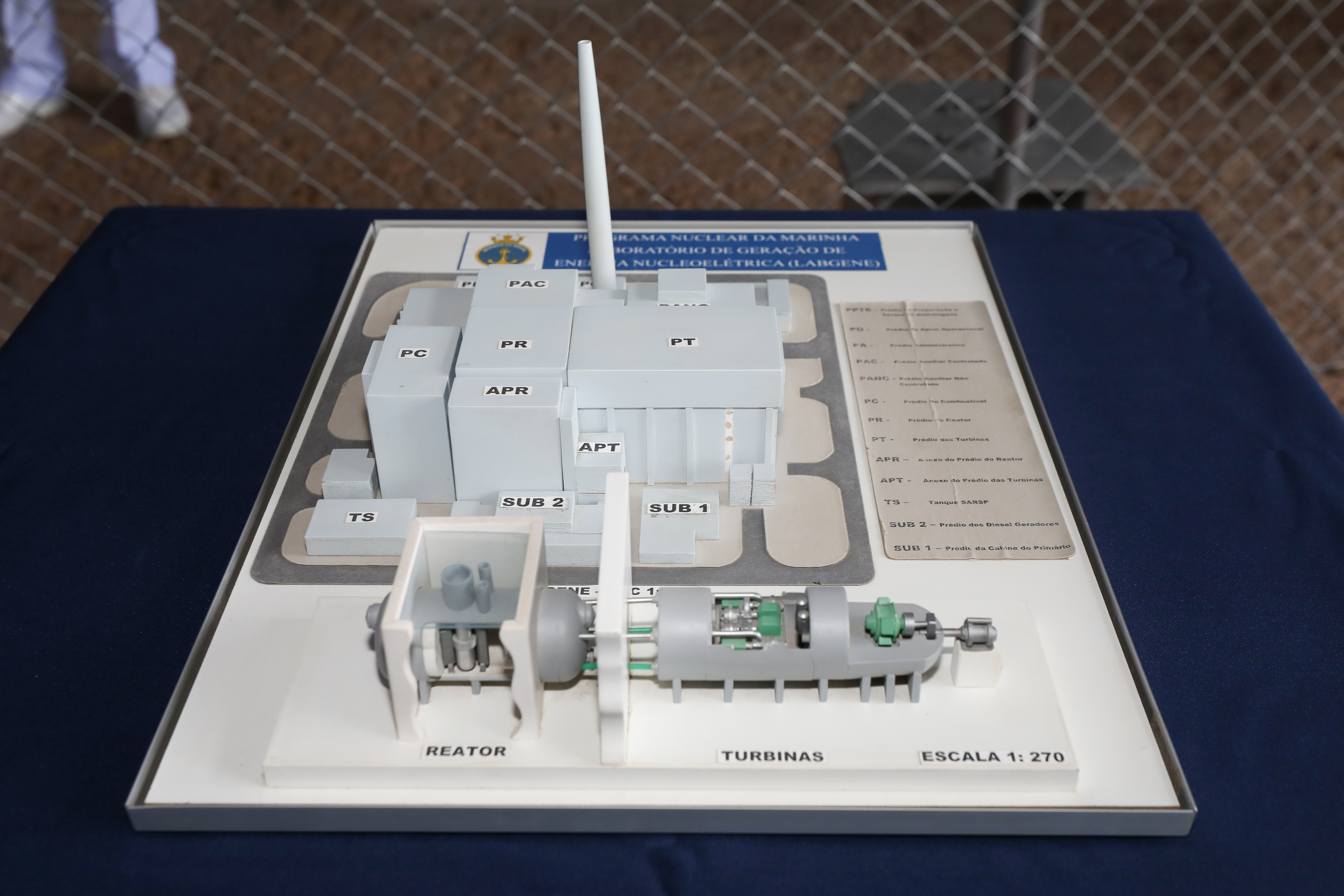
Model of the Labgene facilities

At the turn of the millennium, the Navy Nuclear Program already had its own administrative structure. It is not the same program as the Submarine Development Program (ProSub), created in 2008, although ProSub's success depends on the PNM. The CTMSP was originally subordinate to the Navy's Directorate-General of Materiel (DGMM). In 2016, it was transferred, along with the submarine project coordination office, to the Navy's Directorate-General for Nuclear and Technological Development (DGDNTM). Amazônia Azul Tecnologias de Defesa, a state-owned company created in 2012 and linked to the Navy and the Ministry of Defense, employs personnel from both programs (PNM and ProSub). In 2023, the DGDNTM was moved from Rio de Janeiro to the USP campus in São Paulo.

By 2008, 16,500 military and civilian personnel had at some point taken part in the project, bringing together government agencies, research institutes, universities, and private companies. In the early 1980s, the research group at USP reached 60 engineers and 120 technicians. The number of employees in Iperó reached 800 and fell by half in the 1990s. The workforce would rise again; in 2018, there were 500 nuclear-qualified engineers and technicians and about three thousand direct jobs generated by military organizations in São Paulo and Rio de Janeiro.

== Secrecy and opening ==
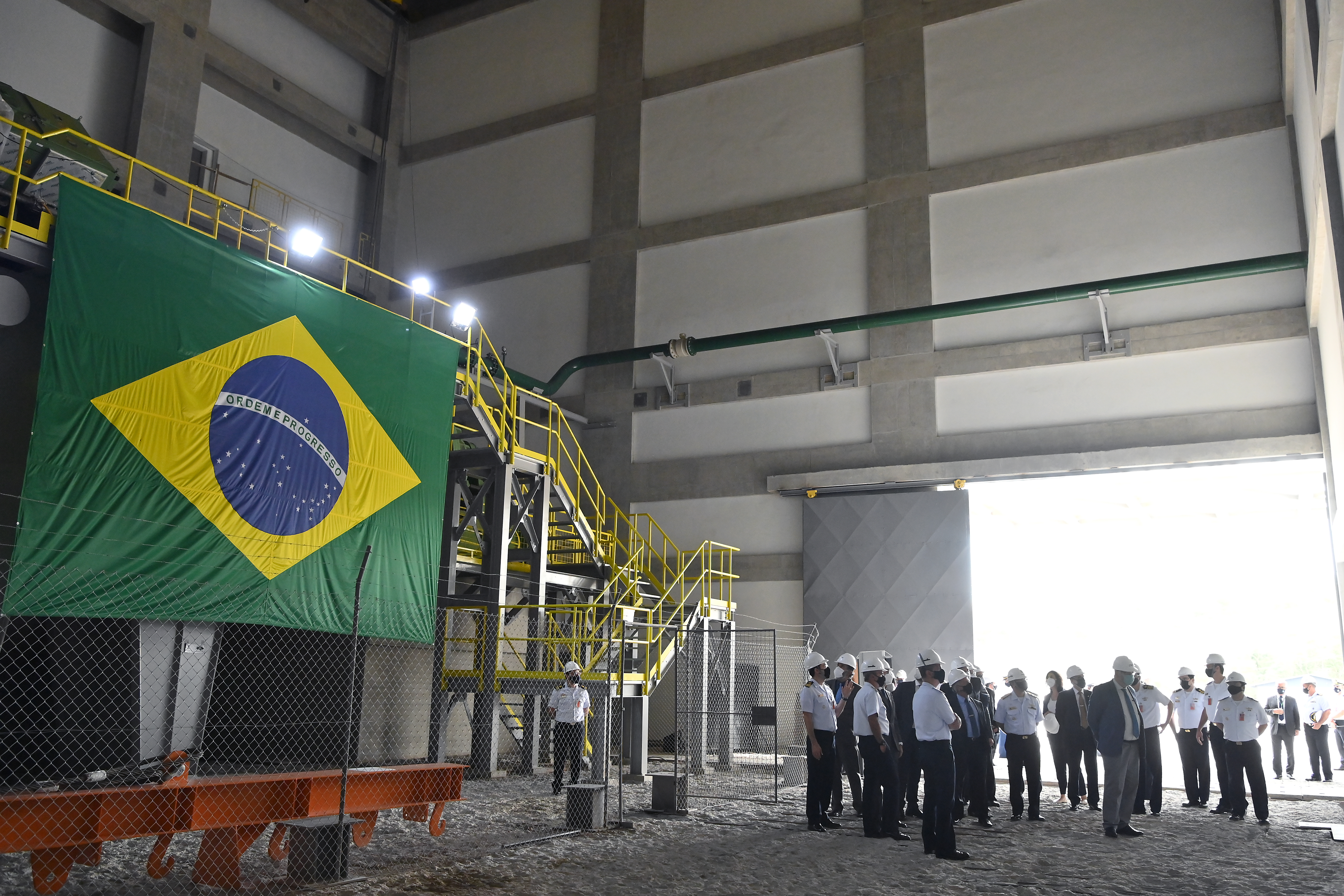
Visit of Rafael Grossi, Director of the IAEA, to the Aramar complex in 2021

State secrecy within a dictatorial regime was the condition under which the Navy Nuclear Program was born. Strategic discussion took place in closed circles, since even within the institution it had autonomous administration and was only disclosed to the highest-ranking admirals. Secrecy was evident in the restricted number of engineers, in the collaboration of companies (more than 150 in the early years), which were compensated with research of their interest, and in finances—the "Delta accounts" with clandestine funds from the National Security Council. Commander Othon and CNEN director Marcos Honaiser managed "Delta Four" from 1983 to 1986. To offset inflation, President João Figueiredo authorized overnight investments. In the words of the newspaper Zero Hora, Othon "lived an espionage thriller behind the scenes of power".

After the opposition's victory in the 1982 gubernatorial election in São Paulo, control was transferred from IPEN to CNEN, removing the São Paulo state government from participation. The sudden change was questioned in the Legislative Assembly of São Paulo, and the government gave evasive answers, as its real fear was that the project would be made public. In the final period of the dictatorship, the Navy realized excessive secrecy was harmful and offered some clarifications. The commander of the 1st Naval District, with jurisdiction over São Paulo, defended the nuclear submarine project in the press in 1983, noting, however, that it would not be a short-term goal. In April 1985, in response to new questions in the São Paulo Assembly about the activities carried out at IPEN, governor Franco Montoro's administration stated that "the government of the State of São Paulo has no knowledge of, nor does it support, the development and construction of a reactor for the nuclear propulsion of a submarine".

From the beginning, there were rumors of the existence of the parallel nuclear program. Starting with the transition of power to civilians in 1985, it became public and was legitimized. Various leaks, including the discovery of the secret accounts by investigative journalist Tânia Malheiros, brought accusations of corruption and forced the government to admit the existence of the parallel program in 1986. An inquiry was opened to investigate irregularities in the secret accounts, and two years later it was closed at the request of the Prosecutor General of the Republic, Sepúlveda Pertence.

Until 1994, the American Central Intelligence Agency (CIA) maintained an intelligence officer from the U.S. consulate in São Paulo, Ray H. Allard, in an apartment next to that of Admiral Othon. According to him, there were other CIA agents investigating the program, and Allard merely diverted the attention of the Brazilian authorities.

=== Discovery of Aramar's activities ===
Construction at Aramar began under the guise that the facilities would be a factory for mechanical equipment. Officers wore civilian clothes, and mayors were assured that no radioactive material would be present on site. Contrary to the Navy's expectations, and despite the region being rural, the construction attracted attention. The large movement of military personnel could not be hidden, and the press and the population of Iperó sought information. Nuclear experts unofficially informed that the complex was linked to the construction of nuclear submarines. In August 1986, Navy Minister Henrique Saboia confirmed that his institution was researching nuclear reactors to be installed on a submarine, and observers connected the announcement to what they were seeing in Iperó. In the same month, an officer overseeing part of the activities in Aramar, Commander Valdo Gomes, denied having information about any reactors at the site.

Osvaldo Noce, a city councilor from Sorocaba representing the Workers' Party (PT), requested clarification from the Navy. In September 1986, officers explained to local mayors and councilors that "the Aramar project will be a propulsion testing center, including for a nuclear submarine", without confirming whether uranium enrichment would take place. They asked for the information to be kept confidential, but the politicians immediately disclosed it to the national press. By October 1986, it was already possible to publish that "there is openly a nuclear submarine project within the so-called Parallel Nuclear Program". At the same time, an Argentine delegation visited the enrichment laboratories.

In August 1987, Commander Othon responded to an official letter from the mayor and the City Council of Sorocaba requesting information about Aramar. He mentioned research on nuclear propulsion but omitted uranium enrichment. In October 1987, to appease local movements against the construction, the Navy invited the mayor of Sorocaba and the rector of USP, José Goldemberg, to visit the complex. Coverage in the local press was constant, detailed, and negative.

=== Deliberate opening ===
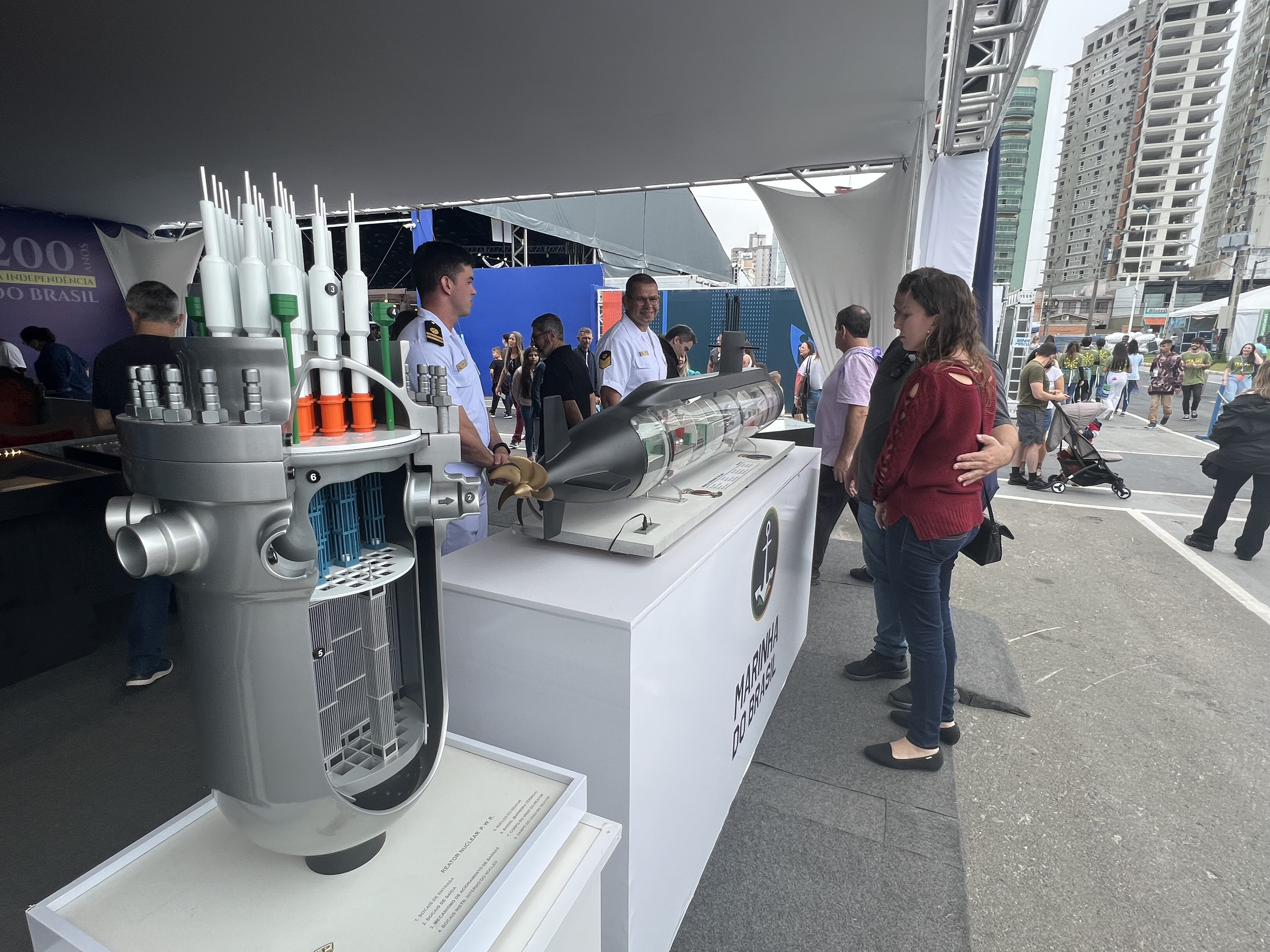
Models of the reactor and the nuclear submarine displayed to the public at a sailing race in 2023

In 1990, Folha de S. Paulo described the PNM as a fact "to which Brazilian society had almost no access". Within the Navy, the first large-scale dissemination of information about the project took place at a major meeting of admirals in 1991. In November 1995, the Navy invited journalists to the CTMSP facilities at USP and in Aramar, but did not allow them to see the building where the centrifuges were made, in order to maintain a "secret more commercial than military", according to a newspaper. Admiral Mauro César Rodrigues Pereira, Navy Minister from 1995 to 1999, promoted a campaign to dissociate the adjective "parallel" from the nuclear program, in a struggle against the tarnish that continues to the present; Admiral Othon makes a point of correcting "autonomous" in place of "parallel".

In search of recognition in public opinion, the Navy has already opened Aramar to public hearings and visits by journalists and authorities, including officials from the International Atomic Energy Agency. The issue of secrecy is still evident in relations with international non-proliferation bodies: according to critics, Brazil has not yet fully opened its nuclear program to the IAEA.

== Technological goals ==
The Navy Nuclear Program was created under the codename Chalana Program and was called that until its officialization, around 1988. It was divided into three projects: study and planning (Zarcão), fuel cycle (Ciclone), and reactor (Remo). In the 1990s, the project names were Uside (uranium enrichment), Proter (reactor prototype), and Costado (the submarines themselves). Since 2008, submarine construction plans have been part of ProSub.

As financial and political conditions varied, the history of the program can be divided into an initial era of rapid progress, stagnation in the 1990s—reaching paralysis between 1995 and 2003—and a resumption starting in 2007. In the nuclear fuel cycle, the most difficult stage and the one subject to the greatest restrictions by the technology holders—uranium enrichment—was mastered in just a few years. The production of uranium hexafluoride (UF_{6}) in 2010 completed the cycle. In 2016, the PNM as a whole was expected to be completed by 2031, when it will be 52 years old.

=== Fuel cycle ===
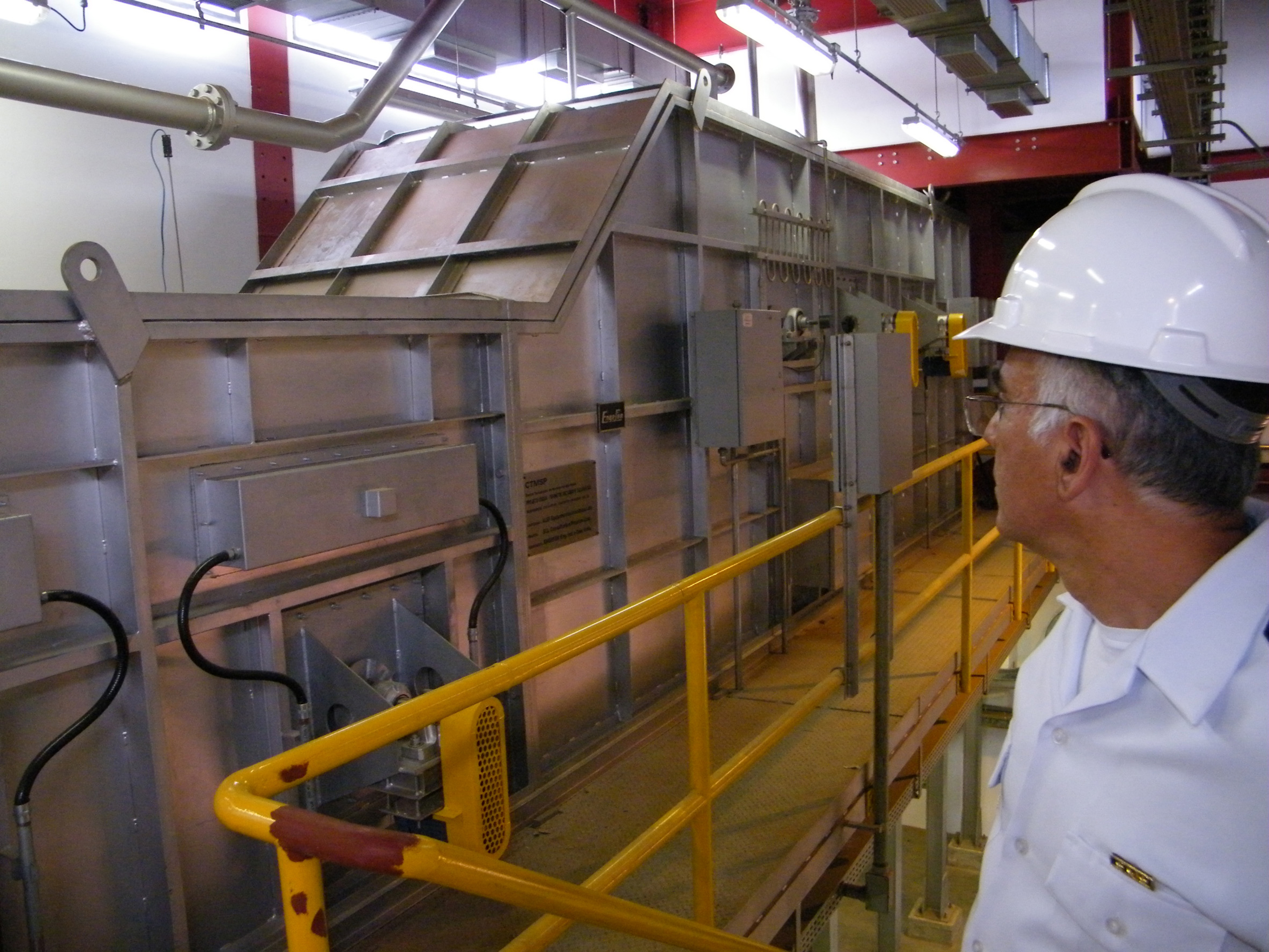
Uranium Hexafluoride (UF6) Plant (Usexa) at Aramar

Nuclear propulsion requires fissionable materials as fuel for a nuclear reactor—in the case of the PNM, uranium-235 (U-235), which is present at a proportion of 0.7% in natural uranium. The remainder is another isotope, uranium-238 (U-238), an inert material in the fission reactions that will release the desired energy. For use in reactors, the proportion of U-235 must be increased—that is, the uranium must be enriched—to at least 3%. In the ultracentrifugation process, which was the method chosen in Brazil, the centrifugal force of a cylinder spinning at high speed pushes the molecules containing the heavier U-238 to the periphery, enriching the sample at the center. The ultracentrifuges are arranged in series and in parallel (the cascade) to repeat the process until the desired enrichment level is reached.

The raw material for the process is uranium hexafluoride (UF_{6}) gas, obtained through uranium mining, processing into yellowcake (U_{3}O_{8}), dissolution, purification, and conversion. After enrichment, UF_{6} is reconverted into uranium dioxide (UO_{2}) powder, which is processed into small pellets, and these are formed into rods made of a metallic alloy. The set of rods, the fuel element, can then be inserted into the nuclear reactor.

In the 1970s, Brazil had already mastered uranium mining and yellowcake production. IPEN was already producing UF_{6} on a laboratory scale and experimenting with the stages of reconversion and pellet production. In addition to mastering uranium enrichment, the PNM gained access, through IPEN, to UF_{6} gas and UO_{2} pellets. In this partnership, until 1988, about four tons of pellets enriched to 3.8% were produced, and the entire stock of gas was transferred to the Navy in 1990. The PNM began testing its own UF_{6} conversion plant in March 2010 and in 2021 signed a contract with Indústrias Nucleares do Brasil (INB) for the supply of UO_{2} pellets to be used in the reactor prototype.

==== Uranium enrichment ====
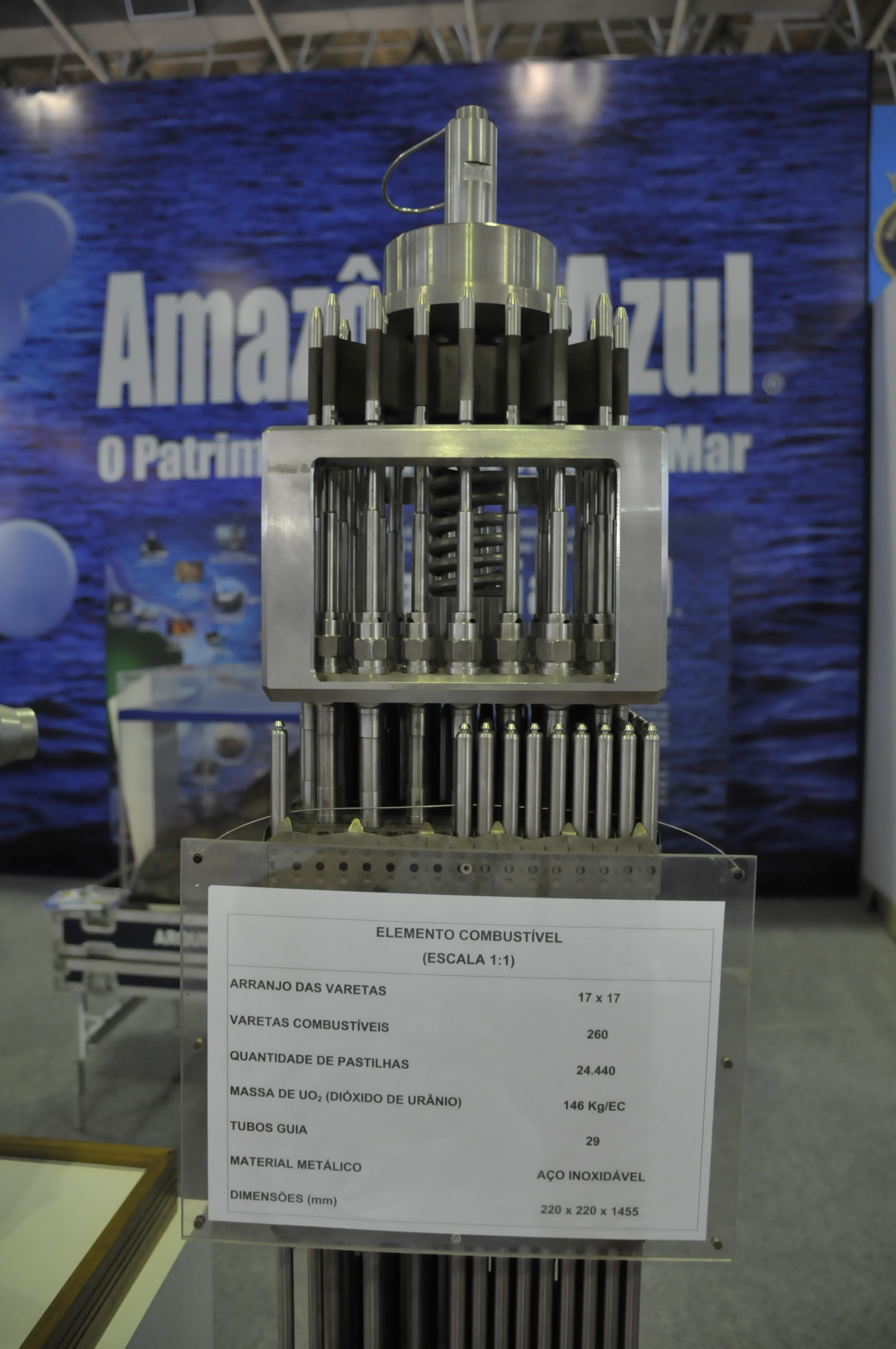
Full-scale model of the fuel element designed by the PNM

Commander Othon's research group developed its own ultracentrifuge design, addressing issues of friction, balancing, and resonance. To withstand the mechanical stresses of tens of thousands of revolutions per minute, the Brazilian machines were built from maraging steel and carbon fiber. The greatest challenge was in the suspension: the Brazilian ultracentrifuge does not use conventional bearings and spins around its axis by magnetic levitation, and maintains a vacuum between the casing and the rotor. This prevents friction between parts, reducing energy consumption and mechanical wear. Details of the system, such as the number and position of magnetic bearings, the rotation speed, and the control system, are classified. According to engineer Roberto M. Sales, the control system measures the displacement between the rotor and a reference point and adjusts the current of the magnets.

The development of the first ultracentrifuge lasted from 2 February 1980 to December 1981. On 4 September 1982, using only two centrifuges, the first milligrams were enriched. The enrichment level was "zero point something", in Othon's recollection; over the next two years, the program studied the collective operation of the machines and industrialized the components for the future enrichment plant, including the steel alloy. In September 1984, nine centrifuges were operating in cascade. The parallel nuclear program could already show greater results than the official one.

In 1985, enrichment of uranium to 20% was achieved. However, enrichment at USP was on a laboratory scale. The next step, therefore, was an enrichment plant, which was established in Aramar, where 48 ultracentrifuges were installed by the time of its inauguration. By 1995, there were about 800. Aramar normally enriches to 5%, but the PNM has already produced at 20% in the past, and this can be done again with international authorization.

By 2008, the PNM had developed seven generations of ultracentrifuges. According to a thesis from the Naval War College, the Brazilian ultracentrifuge is "considered by specialists in the field to be the most efficient among those known". The executive director of the Center for Nonproliferation Studies in Washington remarked in 2004 that "the Brazilians say that [their centrifuge] is 30% more efficient and that it is unique. But it is probably not the most efficient or the newest. Certainly, it must be better than the worst ones. But how much better, I don't know". Given the confidentiality of statistics such as construction cost, energy consumption, and durability, comparisons between competitors are difficult to make. In 2006, state-of-the-art centrifuges yielded between 50 and 100 separative work units (SWU), and new American machines promised to operate at 300 SWU.

The Brazilian centrifuges, according to sources from a correspondent of the Institute of Electrical and Electronics Engineers, operated at just over 10 SWU each. They measure almost two meters in height and spin at supercritical speeds—that is, they would disintegrate from their own resonance were it not for careful engineering. Navy researchers were studying ways to increase the rotor length without altering the bearings. Theory dictates that a centrifuge's output is proportional to rotor length and to the fourth power of its speed. European Urenco centrifuges measure over three meters in height and are also supercritical. The Russians use millions of subcritical centrifuges, each less than one meter tall.

==== Foreign involvement ====
Official sources state that the technology obtained is entirely domestic, but reverse engineering was performed on older-generation German centrifuges already available in Brazil. There are rumors that the true origin lies in the network of Pakistani physicist Abdul Qadeer Khan, but academic consensus does not support this claim. Other rumors about the development mention industrial espionage or the hiring of foreign specialists, such as German engineers Dietrich Hinze and Karl Heinz Schaab. In the 1990s, Othon obtained from Schaab a German machine used in the production of carbon fiber, ordered by Iraq but not delivered due to the Gulf War.

Admiral Othon admitted that technological espionage was carried out abroad, and another admiral, Hernani Fontura, pointed out that "resorting to espionage was not an option used only in Brazil, as other countries did the same to achieve mastery of a technology that no nation was willing to share". There are foreign components, and Admiral Othon admitted that Brazil lied to its suppliers, such as the Germans and Italians, about the intended use of the parts. "Had we not acted this way, the parts would have been much more expensive, or the company would have been pressured not to sell them to us by countries that already possessed the technology". Some components were purchased in France and brought in the diplomatic pouch.

According to an intelligence report from a European ally of West Germany, a secret clause in an agreement with China allowed assistance for the Brazilian nuclear submarine's reactor. There is no further information to prove that such a clause bore fruit, but 220 kilograms of uranium enriched to 4.3%, purchased from the Chinese in 1983, would be found in Aramar the following decade.

=== Reactor and propulsion ===
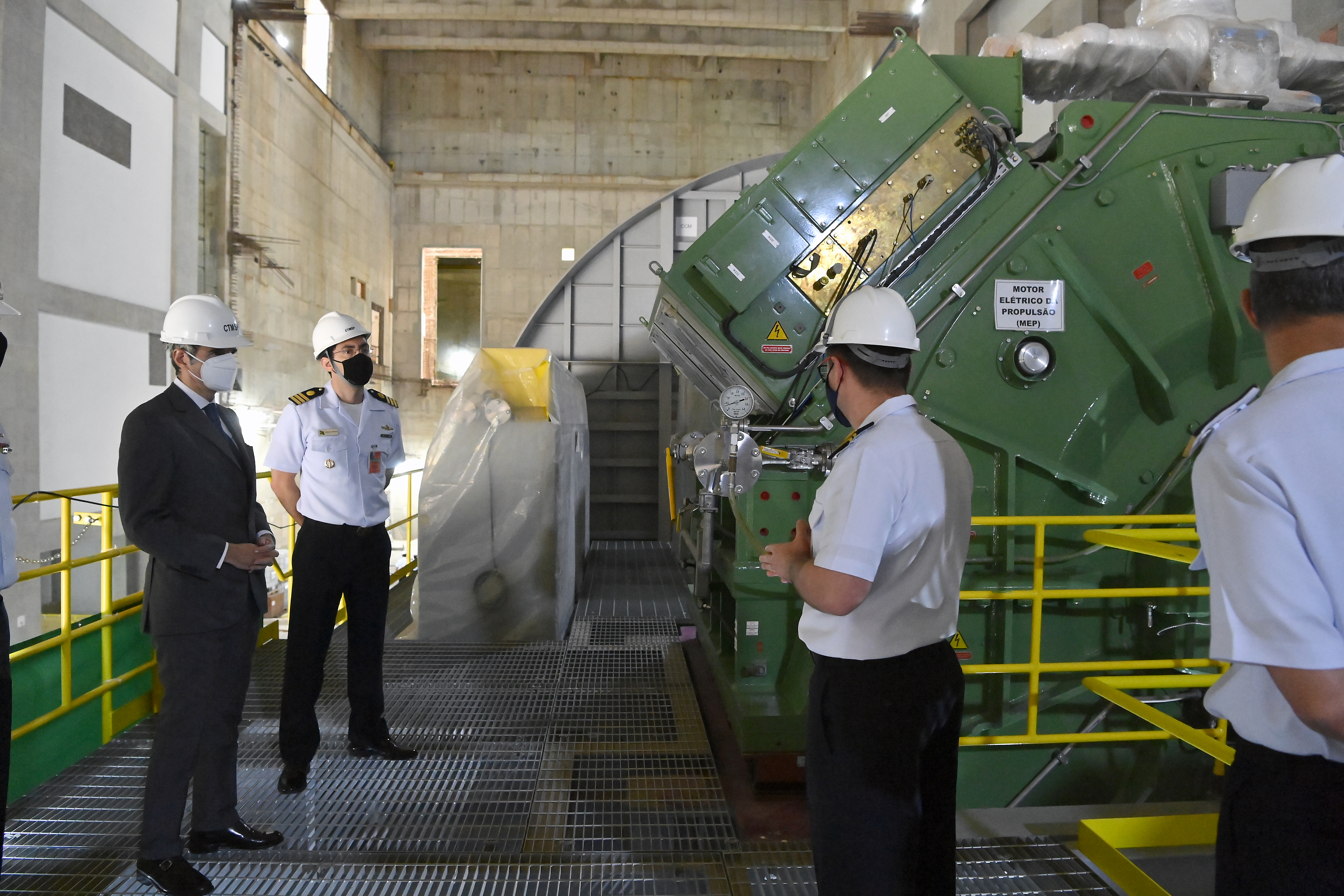
Propulsion Electric Motor (MEP) of Labgene

From 1983 to 1988, Project Remo built the IPEN/MB-01 research reactor, with a maximum output of 100 watts, to simulate on a small scale a larger reactor. For testing, the Navy also used the IEA-R1 research reactor, already present at IPEN. The larger reactor, to be used in the submarine, will be a pressurized water reactor (PWR), consisting of a pressure vessel, reactor internals, fuel element, and Control Rod Drive Mechanism (MAB). The design has three circuits: primary, secondary, and cooling. Nuclear fission heats the water in the primary circuit, which is kept under high pressure and transfers heat to the water in the secondary circuit, without physical contact between the two fluids. In the secondary circuit, the vaporization of the water drives a turbine to power the submarine's electric generators. The steam is then condensed and pumped back to restart the process.

The reactor and other propulsion components have been successively known as the National Pressurized Water Reactor (RENAP), the National Pressurized Water Installation (INAP), and the Nuclear Power Generation Laboratory (Labgene). Its output will be 11 megawatts electric or 48 megawatts thermal, equivalent to the energy needs of a city of 20,000 inhabitants. The project reproduces on land, at full scale, the nuclear plant of the future submarine, divided into sections: dynamometer brake (Block 10), which simulates the propeller; propulsion electric motor (Block 20); turbogenerators (Block 30); and nuclear reactor (Block 40), forming a complex of eleven main buildings: Reactor, Turbines, Fuel, Controlled Auxiliary, Uncontrolled Auxiliary, Package Preparation and Testing, Operational Support, Electrical Substations 1 and 2, Intermediate Waste Storage, and Cooling Units.

In 2000, the press reported that the components for a reactor had already been acquired and were awaiting assembly. The pressure vessel and internals of the reactor prototype were completed in an improvised room in 2005. In 2007, the Navy announced that the reactor was almost complete. At the time, US$130 million in components were stockpiled: a pressure vessel from Nuclebrás Equipamentos Pesados, in Itaguaí; turbine from Deini S.A. Indústria de Base, in Piracicaba; pressurizer and condenser from the Garcia Jaraguá group, in Sorocaba; and generators from Siemens Brasil. WEG in Jaraguá do Sul was expected to supply the electric motors. The project's nationalization rate was over 90%.

The 2007 schedule foresaw that the reactor would be ready by 2014 in an optimistic scenario, or by 2019 in a pessimistic one. In February 2015, the commissioning of Labgene was scheduled for July 2017, but the project was delayed. By 2022, the project was seven years behind the initial schedule. Technical difficulties remain to be overcome in miniaturizing and safely integrating the reactor into the future submarine. As admitted in 2022 by Admiral Marcos Sampaio Olsen, then Director-General of the DGDTNM, Brazilian industry was not capable of supplying all critical technologies, and imports were hindered by the geopolitical interests of suppliers. In 2024, Block 40 was still under construction. It was expected that the Laboratory would first be tested using steam from a fossil-fuel boiler, and finally with nuclear fuel, completing the process in 2027, thereby achieving the first high-power nuclear reactor designed in Brazil.

=== Integration into the submarine ===
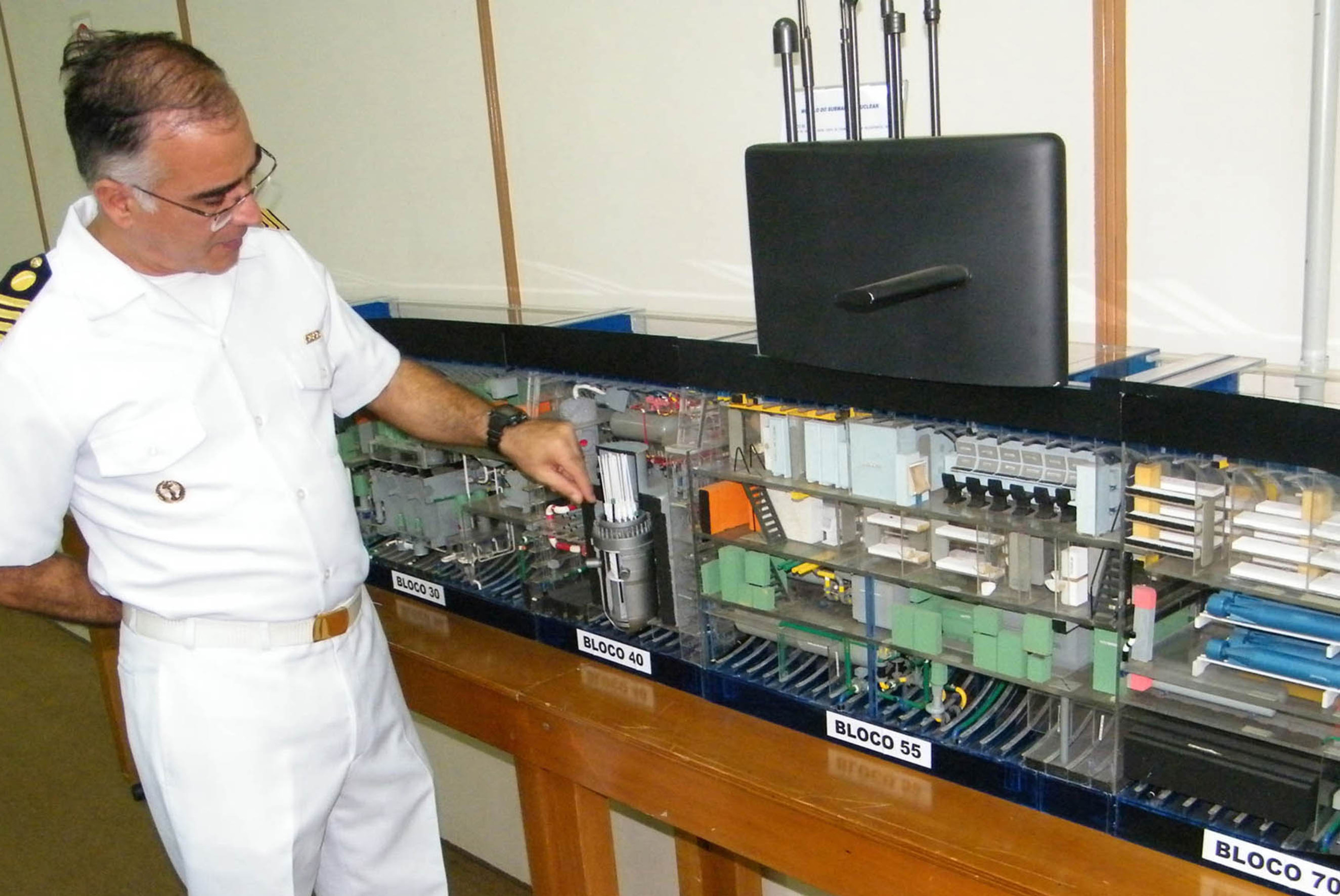
Captain Ferreira Marques points to the reactor in a model of the future SN Álvaro Alberto

The naval program of the early 1980s planned for fourteen submarines: four conventional ones of German design, six conventional ones of Brazilian design, and four nuclear ones of Brazilian design. The nuclear submarines could be a larger-hull version of the conventional design. At the time, Brazil still lacked the capability to build submarines domestically, which was achieved through a contract signed in 1984 with the German shipyard Howaldtswerke-Deutsche Werft. One conventional submarine of the IKL-209 class, designated Tupi in Brazil, was built in Germany, and three others, along with an improved version, the Tikuna, were built at the Rio de Janeiro Navy Arsenal. Engineers, technicians, and workers were sent to the German shipyard to acquire knowledge for a national design.

The design concept for a Brazilian conventional submarine, the Submarino Nacional I (SNAC-I), began in 1986 and was interrupted four years later due to a lack of funds for the detailed design stage. The idea was resumed in 1994, but the design was already outdated and gave way to a new model, the Submarino Médio Brasileiro (SMB-10). This project was also canceled, and the Navy decided to build a hull of foreign design, culminating in the signing of contracts with the French group DCNS for the construction in Brazil of Scorpène-class submarines. This gave rise to ProSub, which by 2025 had already resulted in the commissioning of two conventional submarines, designated as the Riachuelo class. Construction of the nuclear submarine, to be designated Álvaro Alberto, has not yet begun as of March 2025.

=== Civilian uses ===
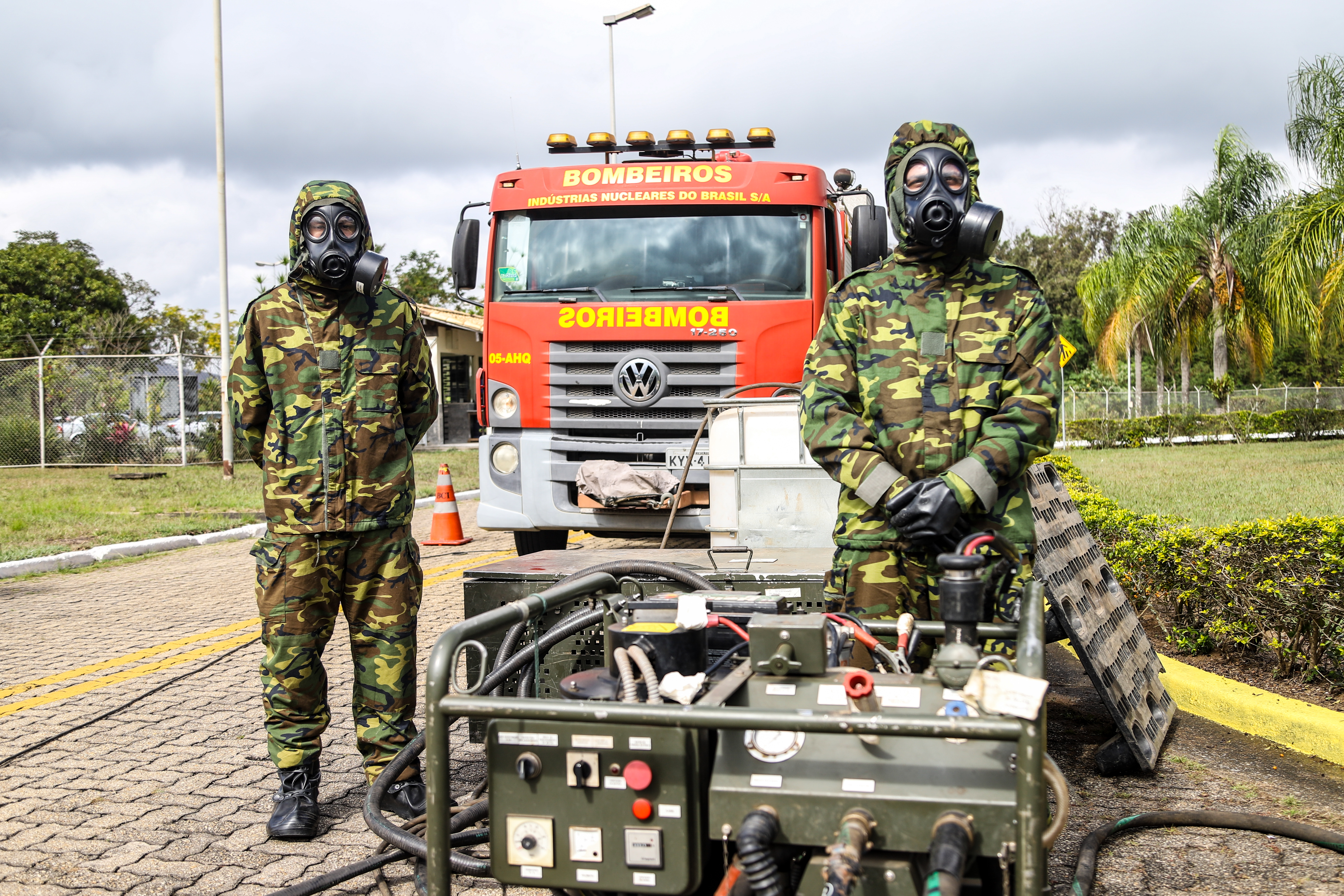
Brazilian Marines in a CBRN defense exercise at Indústrias Nucleares do Brasil in 2023

Enriched uranium is a duel-use material, able to fuel both submarines and nuclear power plants, which helps explain the survival of the PNM. It was through the military that Brazil mastered the nuclear fuel cycle, consolidating the CTMSP among the main research centers in the country's nuclear sector. Likewise, UF_{6} conversion using PNM technology could replace imports from Canada for the civilian nuclear program. The experience gained with Labgene could be applied to small-scale plants for the national power grid. Development of these components brings technological spillover, contributing materials, industrial components, and methods even to non-nuclear sectors.

The PNM has built and modernized research laboratories, trained engineers and technicians, and funded graduate scholarships and research. In addition to IPEN, it has involved the Nuclear Technology Development Center (CDTN) in Belo Horizonte, the Nuclear Engineering Institute (IEN) in Rio de Janeiro, 400 companies, and the universities of Campinas, São Paulo, São Carlos, Santa Catarina, Belo Horizonte, and Rio de Janeiro, the Institute for Technological Research, and the Military Institute of Engineering.

Brazil is the only country without nuclear weapons in which the military transfers uranium enrichment mechanisms to the civilian nuclear program. Laboratory-scale production at USP and pilot-scale production at Aramar were taken to the industrial scale at the Nuclear Fuel Factory in Resende, run by Indústrias Nucleares do Brasil (INB). In October 2003, CNEN president Odair Dias Gonçalves announced the country's entry into the circle of six countries producing enriched uranium on an industrial scale. The Navy, which is the only domestic manufacturer of enrichment ultracentrifuges, supplied them to INB, which produces fuel for the Angra dos Reis power plants. The goal was to have ten cascades of centrifuges installed by 2012, but only three were in service that year, meeting about 5% of the demand of the national plants. Brazil continues to depend on imports for its enriched uranium. The tenth cascade was delivered in 2022. In the long term, the Brazilian nuclear program even aims to export fuel.

The São Paulo state government and the Navy ceded to CNEN an area adjacent to Aramar for the construction of the Brazilian Multipurpose Reactor (RMB). The cornerstone was laid in 2018, and when completed, the reactor will be the second in the region after Labgene. As a research center and producer of radioisotopes, it promises applications in medicine, industry, agriculture, and the environment.

== Government policy ==
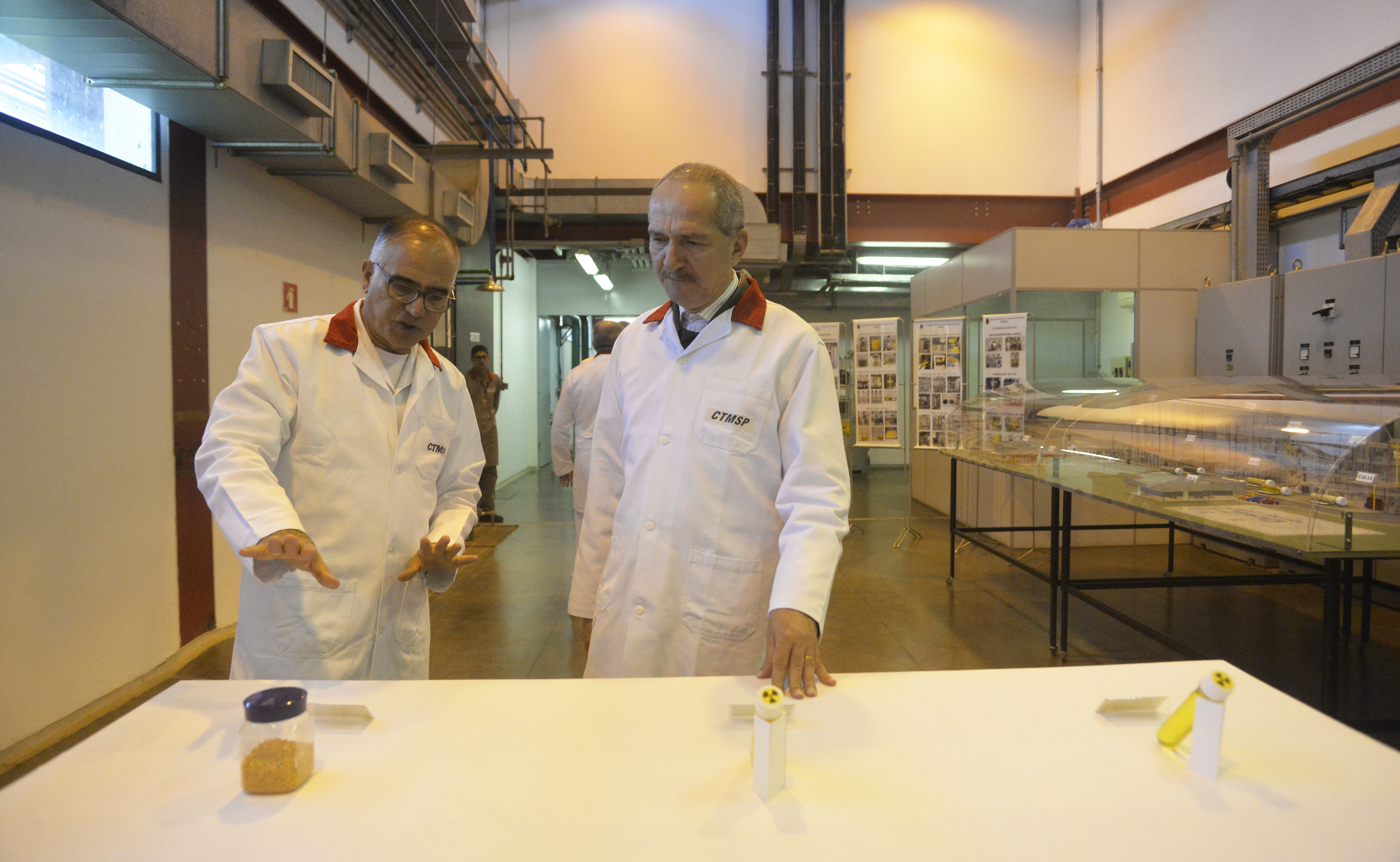
Defense Minister Aldo Rebelo in Aramar

The PNM has spanned multiple decades, two political regimes (the Brazilian military dictatorship and the New Republic), and major changes in international relations, garnering greater or lesser support depending on its alignment with the broader strategic vision, in which it serves the agendas of security, international projection, and independence in sensitive technologies. In general, "nationalist political–military coalitions have tended to support the nuclear submarine project more strongly than 'internationalist' coalitions". Government support for the program was reliable in its early years, faded in the 1990s, and from 2007 returned to the federal agenda and was institutionalized in defense documents.

=== Military dictatorship ===
The federal government's decision in favor of the nuclear submarine program was made during the Geisel administration, but funding only began to be allocated under his successor (1979–1985), João Figueiredo, the last president of the military dictatorship. The results of the first ultracentrifuge and observation of the Falklands War were decisive for the president. Othon denied that there was any connection between the Falklands War and the Navy's nuclear program, but it is likely that the conflict convinced the government of the usefulness of the nuclear submarine in future defense against actions by the great powers. Figueiredo personally approved more personnel for the Chalana Program and discussed nuclear cooperation during his state visit to China in 1983.

The military were in a hurry, as they were aware of the imminent end of the dictatorship. With the Brazilian economy in crisis, authorities prioritized nuclear projects over conventional armaments. The Navy's budget funded the reactor project, while the National Security Council used the "Delta accounts" to sponsor uranium enrichment experiments, which enabled its rapid mastery. On the other hand, the then-president of CNEN, Hervásio Guimarães de Carvalho, refused to finance the Navy's project. According to Renato Archer, he was too close to the United States. In the São Paulo state government, the administration of Franco Montoro, although in opposition, authorized the construction of the Aramar complex and maintained secrecy over the nuclear research at USP, whether due to its dependence on the federal executive, fear of the regime's reaction, or agreement with its strategic value.

The Brazilian president congratulated Argentina in 1983 for its announcement that it had mastered uranium enrichment technology at the Pilcaniyeu complex. Rivalry with Argentina was originally a factor in the Brazilian nuclear program, but this was already changing. The Argentines also had a "parallel" program, and the nuclear authorities of both countries drew closer over what they had in common: external suspicions about their programs and frustration with the restrictions that dominant countries in the field imposed on technology transfer.

=== Sarney administration ===
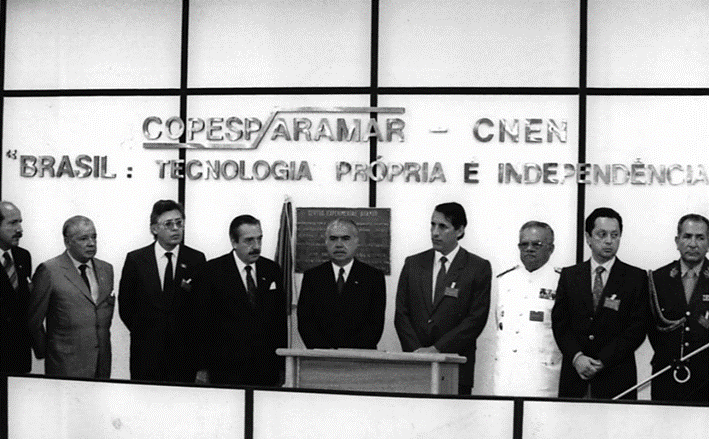
Presidents of Brazil and Argentina at the inauguration of the Aramar Experimental Center in 1988

The return to democracy and the inauguration of civilian president José Sarney (1985–1989) did not interrupt the program, but in the following years it lost its secrecy and received internal and external criticism. Sarney kept physicist Rex Nazaré Alves, a proponent of the parallel program, as president of CNEN, and appointed nationalist Renato Archer to the newly created Ministry of Science and Technology. The military were still influential, maintained close ties to the government, and were able to continue their major projects despite the economic crisis. The president of CNEN admitted the existence of the parallel nuclear program in December 1986, and the following year Sarney announced Brazil's mastery of uranium enrichment.

Sarney visited the Pilcaniyeu facilities in 1987 and invited Argentine president Raúl Alfonsín to the inauguration of the Aramar complex on 8 April 1988. Outside, a police and military security cordon separated them from popular protests against the nuclear program, which was an object of fear and uncertainty for much of the public. The environment was no longer favorable: externally, détente was dissipating the tension between the U.S. and the Soviet Union, and internally, the new Constitution had an anti-war tone and was critical of the nuclear arms race, renouncing any non-peaceful use of nuclear activities and ensuring congressional control over the sector. The press discussed risks to the population, the possibility of developing nuclear weapons, and the lack of congressional oversight over the program. Public opinion of the Sarney government was deteriorating, and the military and their projects carried the stigma of the dictatorship.

The 1987 National Constituent Assembly rejected, by 253 votes to 87, Theodoro Mendes' proposal to cancel the Aramar project. Voting in defense of Aramar were the Liberal Party, the Liberal Front Party, the Social Democratic Party, the Brazilian Democratic Movement Party, the Brazilian Communist Party, and about half of the Democratic Labor Party and Brazilian Labor Party. Voting in favor of the proposal were the other half of those two parties, as well as the Communist Party of Brazil, the Brazilian Socialist Party, and the Workers' Party. Nationalist discourse united both the left and the right in the pro-Aramar coalition, while opponents of the project joined the anti-nuclear movement of the period.

President Sarney's rhetoric sought to associate the program with national development. Rex Nazaré Alves, president of CNEN, protested that "developed countries, while using these technologies for their own benefit, at the same time make it difficult for new countries to access them, creating obstacles to the acquisition of information, materials, and equipment". Both stressed that Brazil had no hegemonic ambitions and would not seek nuclear weapons. The Navy Minister, Admiral Henrique Saboia, stated to O Estado de S. Paulo, shortly after the inauguration of Aramar, that:

Brazilians need to believe that there is a government decision to use nuclear energy for peaceful purposes. The Navy Ministry's long-term goal is to develop a nuclear submarine, but it must be made very clear that only the nuclear propulsion system will be nuclear. The propulsion system is used as a source of heat, and it is this steam-driven turbine that will power nuclear submarines. At the moment ... the purpose is not military, but we will not submit our technology to the International Atomic Energy Agency (IAEA), as a political decision. As for nuclear submarines (...) we will have no forecast or set dates for their construction. We have a program to get there. Perhaps I will invite you to the inauguration in the future (...)

=== 1990s ===
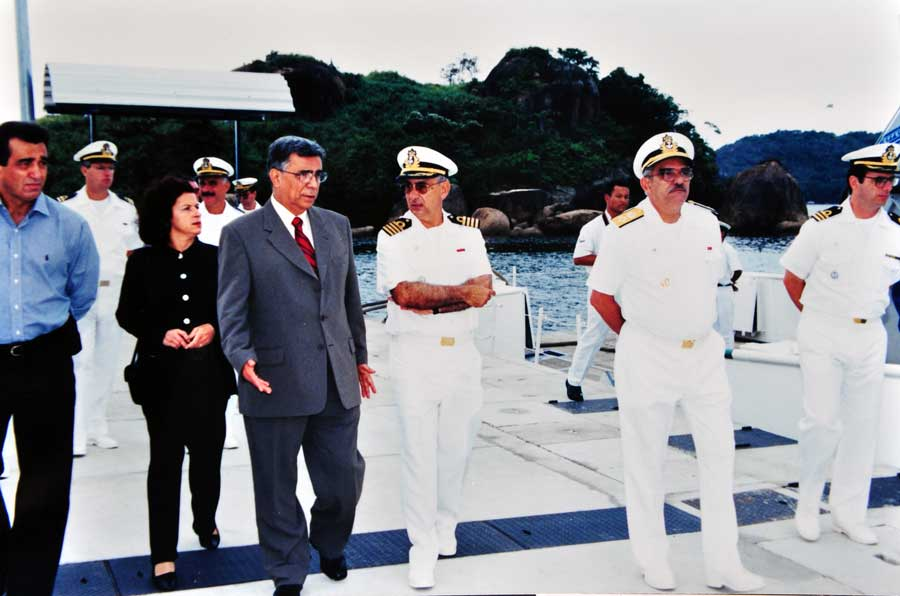
Élcio Álvares, Defense Minister in the FHC administration (in a suit), with the Navy Commander, Admiral Sérgio Chagasteles (second from right to left)

Presidents Fernando Collor (1990–1992), Itamar Franco (1992–1995), and Fernando Henrique Cardoso (1995–2003) were opposed to the nuclear submarine. The program was not canceled, but it was subjected to conflicting priorities and financial difficulties, gradually losing its subsidies from the federal budget. Scientific and technological output stagnated. The power of the Armed Forces was in decline, the Brazilian defense industry was devalued, and foreign policy took a pacifist direction. Brazil joined the international nuclear non-proliferation regime, forming the Brazilian–Argentine Agency for Accounting and Control of Nuclear Materials (ABACC) in 1991, joining the Nuclear Suppliers Group in 1996, and acceding to the NPT in 1998.

Collor had the political leeway to ignore military suggestions, was critical of nuclear armament and of expenditures on the nuclear program, and was closer to the United States. Differentiating himself from his predecessors, he adhered to international agendas. His cabinet included two ministers with similar stances, José Goldemberg (Science and Technology) and José Lutzenberger (Environment). At CNEN, Collor replaced Rex Nazaré Alves with a trusted appointee, José Luiz de Santana de Carvalho. To publicly mark Brazil's renunciation of nuclear weapons, Collor, in front of cameras, poured a shovelful of lime into the Air Force's nuclear test shaft at Serra do Cachimbo (Brigadeiro Velloso Testing Range).

The clandestine funds for the parallel program became a scandal in the press, and in 1990 Congress convened a Parliamentary Commission of Inquiry (CPI) to investigate the program. The Navy's project was at the center of attention; Folha de S. Paulo called it the "main known project of the parallel program". In their testimonies before the CPI, Renato Archer and Admiral Othon raised the banners of technological independence and criticism of American pressure, but for the new government, Aramar symbolized the past. The commission's final report ordered the end of clandestine financing but praised the project's technological achievements and defended the protection of industrial secrets. Budget cuts dismantled the Army and Air Force programs, but the Navy was able to continue its project. Collor visited Aramar on 31 May 1991.

Itamar Franco moved closer to the military but did not alter foreign policy. Fernando Henrique Cardoso had no commitment to the project and, in the previous decade, when he was a senator, was one of its critics, but he saw potential in sharing its scientific and technological achievements with civil society. The nuclear submarine objective was frozen in 1996, but activities in Aramar continued. The government resumed construction of Angra II. To avoid the dispersion of the program's workforce, the Navy Minister himself proposed transferring the ultracentrifuges so that INB could produce fuel, and the agreement was signed in 1998.

=== 2000s ===
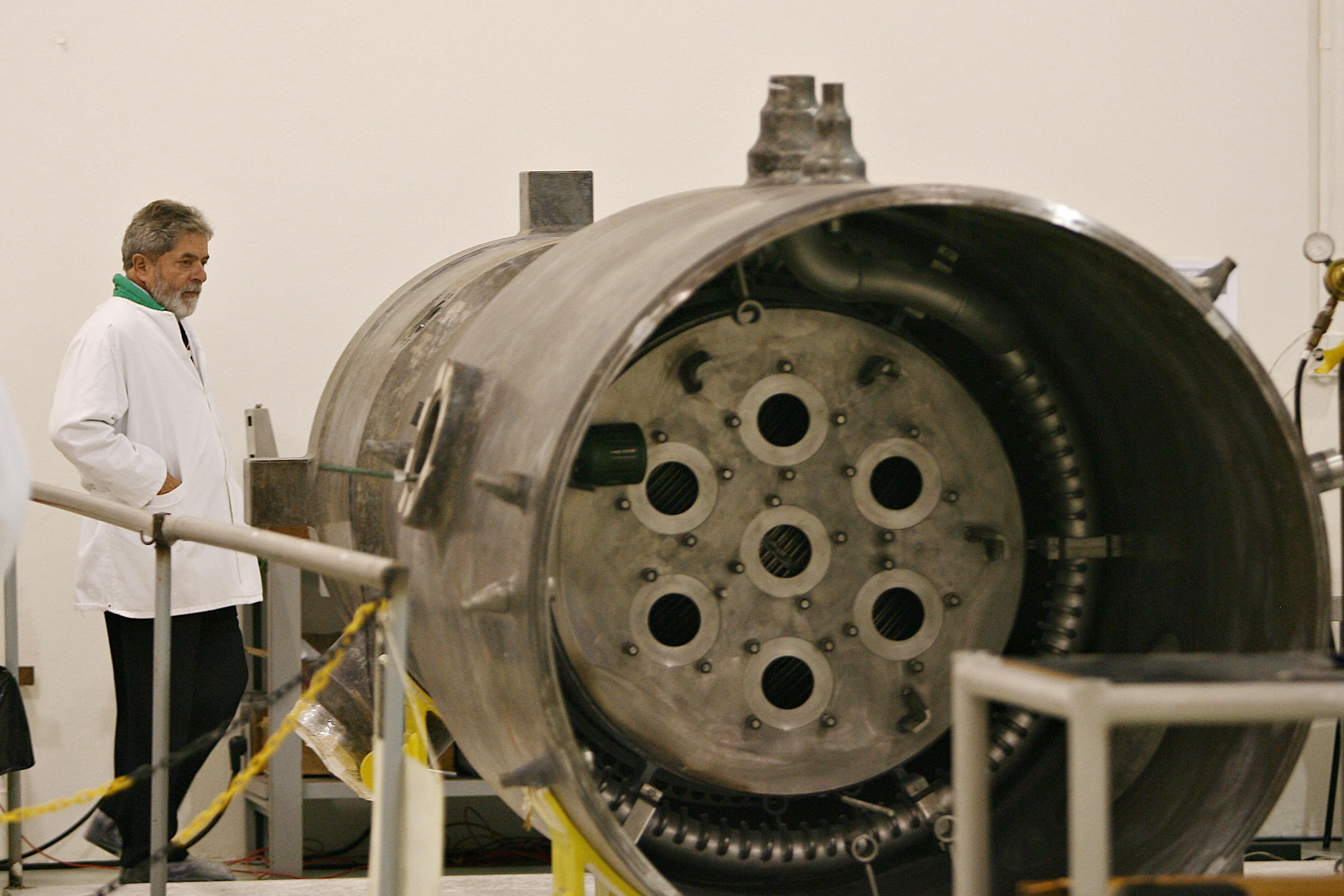
President Lula at the Labgene in 2007

In response to the 1999 blackout, in February of the following year the government allocated 34.7 million reais to the program. There was also an attempt to revive the nuclear submarine project, but Congress did not approve the funding. Lobbying in favor of the project remained active, and in the 2002 presidential campaign, the two main candidates, José Serra and Luiz Inácio Lula da Silva, supported the continuation of the PNM. Lula's support, as a representative of the political left, removed the program's lingering stigma of association with the military dictatorship.

Lula's two terms in office (2003–2011) were a period of renewed developmentalist thinking, and thus of justifications for investing in the program. The nuclear submarine project was formally resumed in October 2003, but the campaign promise was not fulfilled in the first term; Lula maintained his predecessor's policy, focusing the PNM on INB, until he reconsidered the nuclear issue. The period from 2003 to 2007 was the worst for the project's finances, with the Navy providing only the minimal funds necessary for its survival, hoping for future government support. In December 2006, the Navy Commander, Admiral Roberto de Guimarães Carvalho, stated that "there is not, and never has been, a project to build a nuclear submarine. The Navy dreams of the nuclear submarine, but that is not enough. In addition to our dream, there must be a national will, translated into resources, in order to turn the dream into reality".

During Lula's second term, this vision aligned with the government's ambitions for international prestige, a positive economic outlook, the discovery of pre-salt oil reserves, and the concurrent demand for maritime defense capabilities. In 2007, the president visited Aramar and announced the release of more than one billion reais, to be paid in annual installments of 130 million. The following year, he signed agreements with France for the construction of the Riachuelo-class submarines, accelerating the non-nuclear part of the project. French companies do not participate in the PNM itself. The new funds were allocated both to complete the nuclear program and to make the submarine a reality.

New defense documents elevated the PNM to the status of state policy. The first edition of the National Defense Strategy (END), published in 2008, outlined three strategic technological sectors—nuclear, space, and cyber—respectively assigned to the Navy, Air Force, and Army. For the nuclear sector, the END set goals to expand the fuel cycle to an industrial scale, discover new uranium deposits, expand the peaceful uses of nuclear energy, and develop human resources. For the Navy, it prioritized sea denial through a robust force of conventional and nuclear submarines. To overcome external dependence and the restrictions imposed by developed countries, its development would have to be autonomous. References to the civilian nuclear sector are not common in a defense policy document like the END.

=== 2010s ===
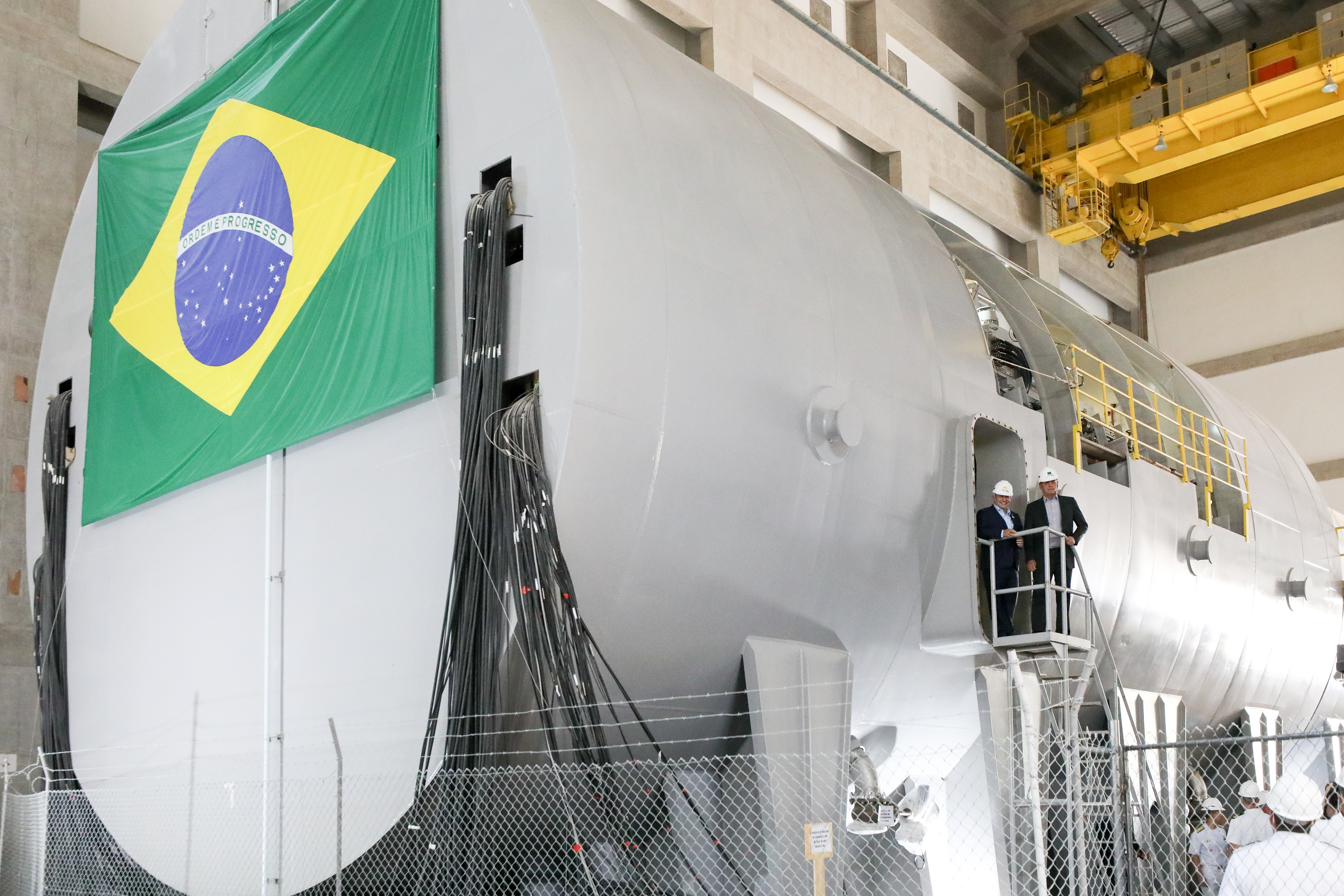
President Jair Bolsonaro and Minister of Science and Technology Marcos Pontes at Labgene in 2020

According to Rear Admiral Luís Antônio Rodrigues Hecht, from COGESN, in 2011 most of the PNM's funding came from the Navy's budget. In the mid-2010s, the schedule was again delayed due to federal budget cuts.

Admiral Othon was imprisoned between 2015 and 2017 after the Operation Car Wash corruption investigations accused him of receiving bribes in the Angra 3 nuclear reactor construction project. By then, Othon was no longer working in the PNM, and the Navy denied the information, reported in the press, that he had been "a sort of supervisor" in the ProSub program. Even so, his symbolic value for the nuclear program continued to be invoked. Public and legal defenses of the admiral emphasized his past achievements and reputation as a nationalist and guardian of state secrets. They blamed foreign agents, insinuating an external interest in undermining Brazil's nuclear program. The mainstream press was critical of Othon, while specialized defense media and politicians from both sides of the political spectrum questioned his arrest.

Commenting on the case, Matias Spektor wrote in O Estado de S. Paulo that "Brazil is the only country whose civil nuclear program is controlled by a military force, the Navy. The secrecy practiced serves both to protect technological secrets and to cover up illicit practices". Defense journalist Luiz Padilha objected to conflating the construction of civilian nuclear plants (where corruption allegations existed) with the Navy's nuclear program. The CNEN, not the Navy, controls the civil nuclear program.

=== 2020s ===
The certification of nuclear fuel requires international backing, and its pursuit reflects national foreign policy. Under Foreign Minister Ernesto Araújo, from 2019 to 2021, the policy was alignment with the United States. Negotiations with Russia were halted, but Navy delegations in Washington made no progress in the field of nuclear fuel certification. The Russian option was then resumed under the influence of the military wing of President Jair Bolsonaro's administration, led by Admiral Flávio Rocha, Secretary of Strategic Affairs of the Presidency. The admiral visited Moscow in December 2021, followed by President Bolsonaro in February 2022. The nuclear issue was mentioned in conversations with Russian President Vladimir Putin, but no official document is known on the matter, and the fallout from Russia's invasion of Ukraine made it difficult to continue negotiations.

Budget cuts still affect the PNM, despite its inclusion in the Growth Acceleration Program, and prolong its history of delays. From 2008 to 2024, the Navy's budget disbursed 3.6 billion reais on the project, having reached 65.9% of the physical target for facility construction.

== Intramilitary debate ==
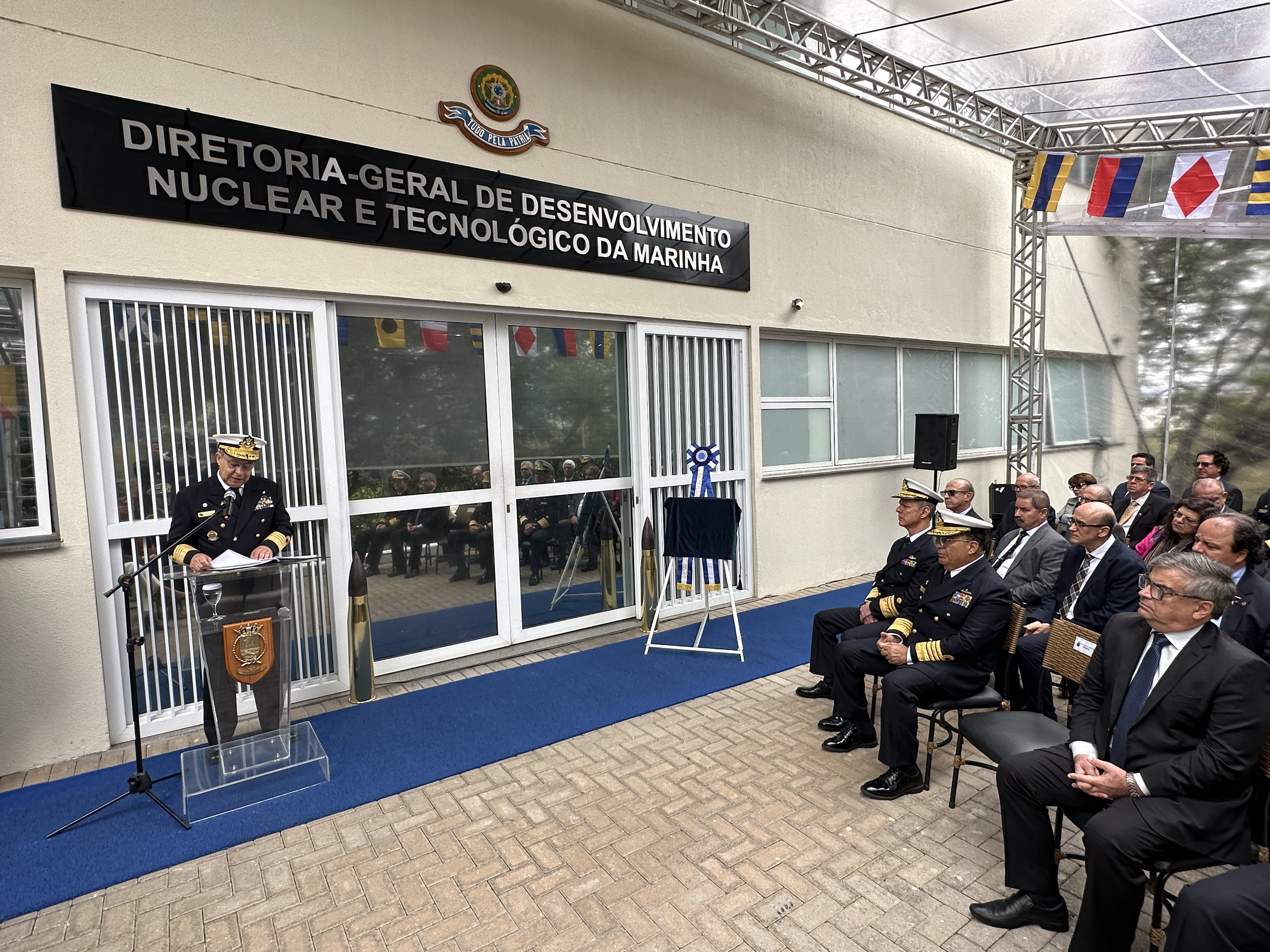
Ceremony for the transfer to São Paulo of the headquarters of the Navy's Directorate-General for Nuclear and Technological Development, in 2023

In Brazilian military thought, scientific and technological mastery of the nuclear field is considered essential for security and development—a pairing typical of War College doctrine. On the development side, strategists are favorable to peaceful uses, such as the design and construction of nuclear power plants and the production of their fuel. More controversial uses, such as nuclear propulsion, would be on the security side. Such technologies would not be transferred by the few countries that dominate them—what some authors call a "technological apartheid"—highlighting the need for independent development. The nuclear submarine itself is valued by strategists for its technical advantages over conventional ones, which result in weapons of greater deterrent effect and better suited to defending extensive areas. The use of submarines in the Falklands War is frequently cited in their arguments.

=== Competition for resources ===
Official histories of the PNM and of the nuclear submarine project present the image of a united and cohesive force, as is customary for a military institution. However, competition for budget and human resources, the clash between modernizing and corporative decision-making processes (the latter defending the structure and personnel expenditures), discomfort with the program's independence and secrecy, and mismatched personalities have already made them the dividing line of internal dissensions. Initially, under the administrations of Admirals Karam (1984–1985), Saboia (1985–1990), and Flores at the Navy Ministry, naval leadership showed a certain "condescension" toward Admiral Othon, in Flores's words, "because we understood it was the price to pay for it to move forward". There was resistance in the engineering area, since the project drained human resources. What made the divisions harder to reconcile was the budget drought of the 1990s.

Despite its measures against the parallel nuclear program, the Collor administration included Admiral Flores, one of the main defenders of the nuclear submarine, who let the Navy's budget bear the burden when the federal government reduced its subsidies to the PNM. From 1992 to 1994, Flores moved to the Secretariat for Strategic Affairs, from where he maintained a certain level of federal support for the program. The difficulties came from the Navy Minister himself, Admiral Ivan da Silveira Serpa, who represented a conservative strategic conception that did not prioritize submarines. The nuclear project was costly, the military budget reduced, and the minister chose to focus it on renewing the surface fleet. Aramar continued to receive institutional funding, but the nuclear submarine was no longer a priority for either the Navy or the federal government.

At a meeting of admirals in 1991, there was "unanimous approval of the work and achievements in the areas of uranium enrichment, the fuel cycle, and nuclear reactors", but "widespread disapproval of the ideas put forward for building the submarine, whether because of its conception or because it was being conducted outside the Navy's normal structure, especially by those who had no experience in shipbuilding", according to Admiral Mauro César Rodrigues Pereira. Investment funds had dropped to a little over 120 million reais, and the nuclear submarine project cost 100 million; for him, "would it be reasonable to destroy the Navy and neglect its minimal obligations to favor an investment that, even if entirely successful, would only materialize in fifteen or twenty years?"

=== Conflicting accounts ===
According to Admiral Othon, during Serpa's administration "everything that could be done to make life difficult was done", including the opening of 33 inquiries against him, none of which found him guilty. He only left the project in 1994 because his time of service in the Navy had ended. For Admiral Flores, Serpa "was excessively strict in cutting what he called Othon's excessive freedom. Othon, in turn, did not make things easy", and there was a "violent conflict" between the two figures. Othon's methods were troublesome: in 1993, without authorization from his superiors, he hired two companies headed by officers to bring in 400 more employees. Soon after, he discovered that a couple loitering around his home was investigating him under orders from the Navy Intelligence Center.

In Admiral Mauro César's recollection, Serpa had full support of the admiralty to remove Othon from the project, and Othon retaliated with a biased version of events. This was the case with the project's priority level, which, according to Othon, had dropped from first to eighteenth place; Mauro César countered that there had been no unified priority ranking before.

From 1995 onward, the Navy had to sustain the program on its own, leaving it in a "vegetative" state. Nuclear propulsion was postponed to an indefinite future. Admiral Mauro César, Serpa's successor at the Ministry of the Navy, held a similar view: both believed the nuclear submarine project was too costly, but neither abandoned its funding. Admiral Roberto de Guimarães Carvalho, Navy Commander (a position that replaced that of minister in 1998) from 2003 to 2007, included PNM funding in the investment program submitted to the Chief of Staff of the Presidency, but had to keep it at low priority to focus on surface fleet capabilities. It was only in 2007 that the Navy Command (formerly the Ministry) was taken over by a well-known proponent of the nuclear submarine, Admiral Júlio Soares de Moura Neto.

For Admiral Othon, "a certain school of thought—and we had four administrations [Serpa, Mauro César, Chagasteles, and Carvalho] from this school—does not want to finish the project". Mauro César argued that these administrations did what they could to keep the program alive in a scenario of "resource strangulation"; he himself took Fernando Henrique Cardoso to Aramar and even considered the direct purchase of a French nuclear submarine. For historian João Roberto Martins Filho, the "tensions pitted influential admirals against each other, but apparently the budget cuts did not depend on the Navy, but on external political circumstances".

== Environmental issues ==
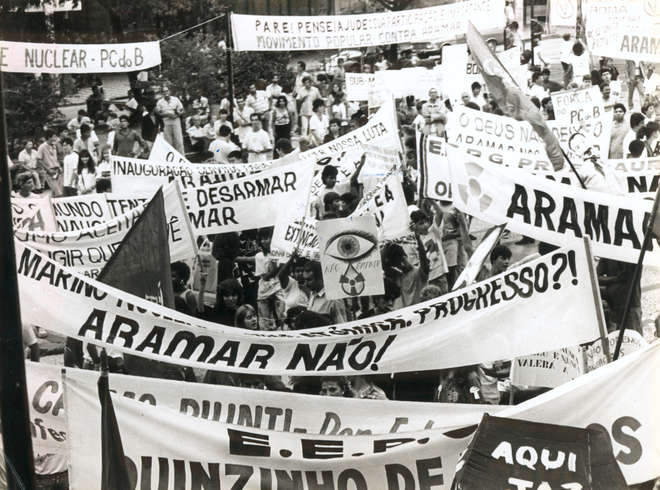
Protest against the Aramar complex in 1987

In the second half of the 1980s, the Brazilian environmentalist movement, then in full maturation, turned against specific actions of Brazil's nuclear policy. These were local movements that were leveraged by political parties, especially from the center-left, to criticize the opacity of the government. Accidents at Chernobyl and Goiânia stigmatized nuclear technology, and the lack of official information about the parallel nuclear program was an aggravating factor. For much of the population, the construction of the Aramar complex was seen as a risk. In the municipalities around Sorocaba, students, mayors, city councilors, union members, religious leaders, and journalists mobilized against the construction.

Construction began without an Environmental Impact Report (RIMA), according to a petition from the mayor and city council of Sorocaba to a Federal Court. In response to that document, Commander Othon clarified that radiological monitoring was being carried out in the region, but did not mention the RIMA. The Brazilian Bar Association, repeating the same concern, questioned the legality of the project. After visiting the Navy complex in October 1987, physicist José Goldemberg reported on the risks of using the facility to enrich uranium to weapons-grade levels. "As for the reactor, one cannot say that there is absolute safety". The movement against Aramar used lectures, debates, pamphlets, and demonstrations, culminating in ten thousand people on the streets of Sorocaba on 20 November 1987.

In 1988, delegations from various groups, including Germany's Green Party, attended the 1st National Meeting on Nuclear Energy, held in Sorocaba's Reading Hall. They produced a manifesto, the "Carta de Sorocaba", calling for the deactivation of Aramar and a review of the Brazil–Germany Nuclear Agreement. The Navy and the government responded by providing food, lectures, pamphlets, and guided visits for the local population. Public hearings helped build parliamentary support. Opposition efforts did not prevent the government from inaugurating the facilities in Iperó, despite surrounding protests and the absence of fourteen invited regional mayors, who refused to attend the event.

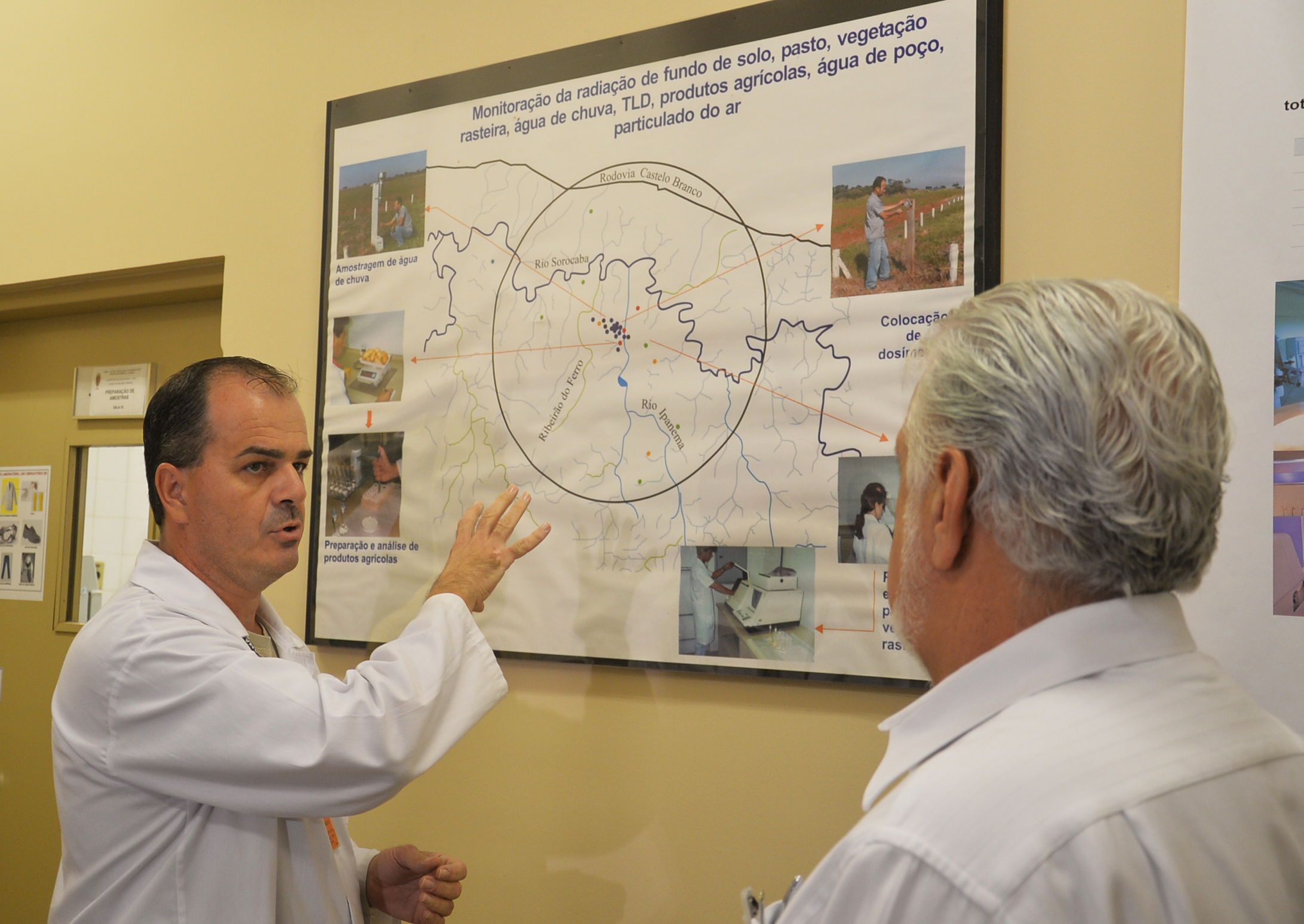
Defense Minister Jaques Wagner is shown a radiation monitoring map of the surroundings of Aramar

Several leaks of uranium hexafluoride and cases of worker contamination occurred at Aramar between 1994 and June 1996, according to a confidential Navy Ministry dossier made public in December 1996.

After the Fukushima I nuclear accident in Japan in 2014, Sorocaba's Cruzeiro do Sul newspaper asked the Navy about the matter. According to the institution's Social Communication Center, the CTMSP complies with industrial and nuclear safety regulations, as well as environmental protection and preservation laws, following licensing processes with CNEN and IBAMA. It stated that "the incident in Japan has no statistical correlation with the Sorocaba region" and that Labgene buildings are designed to withstand the high-intensity winds observed in the area and earthquakes up to magnitude 4 on the Richter scale.

One of Aramar's facilities, the Radioecological Laboratory, is responsible for controlling released effluents and monitoring environmental samples in the vicinity of the complex. Since 2010, the Brazilian Marine Corps has maintained in Iperó a specialized unit for the physical security of the facilities and emergency response, the 1st Battalion for Nuclear, Biological, Chemical and Radiological Protection and Defense (1º BtlProtDefNBQR). (Note: Previously the Nuclear, Chemical, Biological, and Radiological Defense Company of Aramar, and later a battalion, it adopted its current name in 2025.) The Naval Hospital Marcílio Dias, in Rio de Janeiro, has infrastructure to treat victims of nuclear accidents.

== Proliferation issues ==
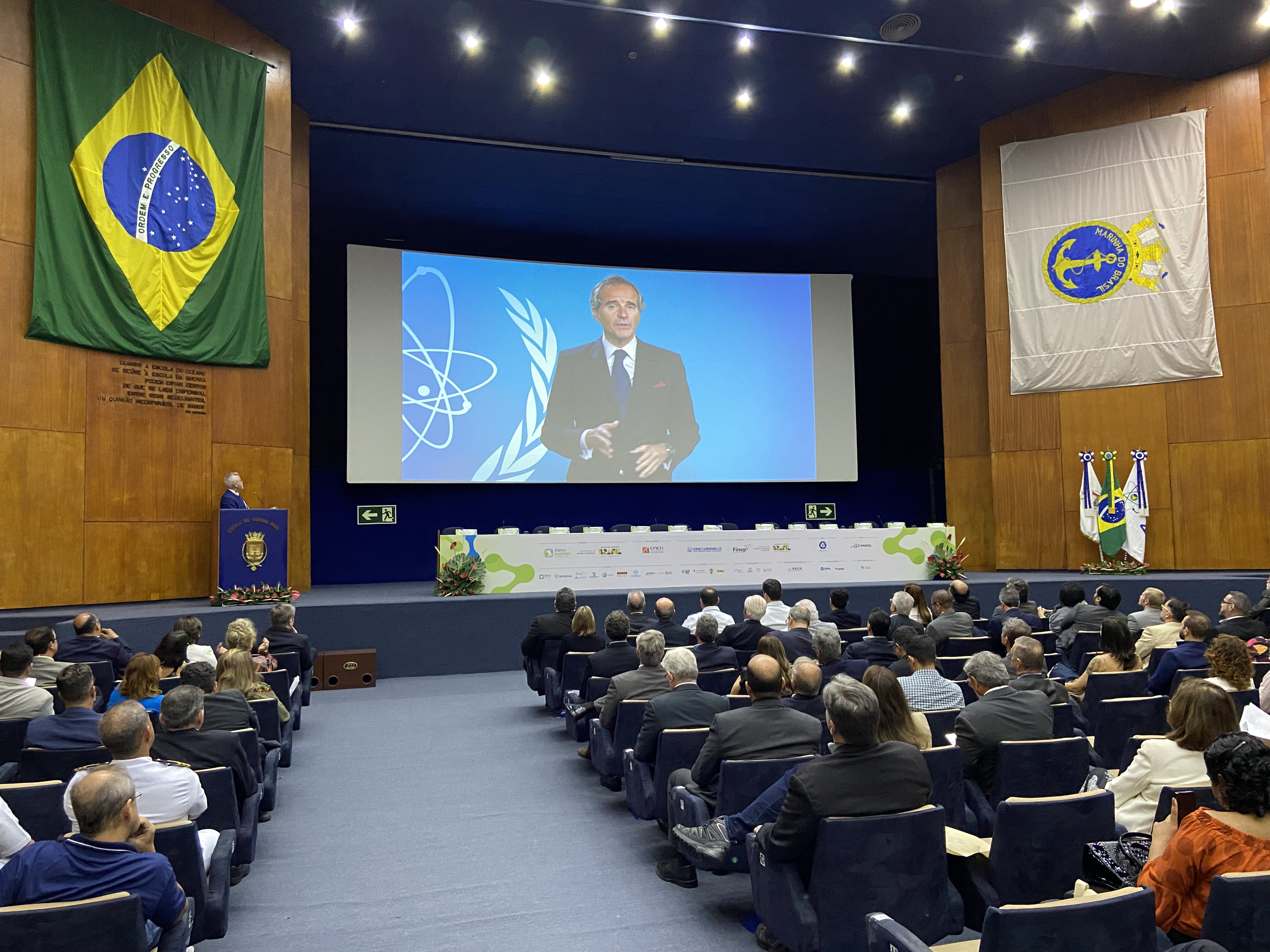
11th International Atlantic Nuclear Conference in the auditorium of the Naval War College

The 2008 National Defense Strategy states that "Brazil has a commitment – stemming from the Constitution and its adherence to International Treaties – to the strictly peaceful use of nuclear energy. However, it affirms the strategic need to develop and master this technology", carrying out, "among other initiatives that require technological independence in nuclear energy, the nuclear-powered submarine project".

Since Brazil does not possess nuclear weapons, the program raises questions about the uranium enrichment level and the safeguards regime. The official policy does not dispel doubts of some foreign observers regarding the implications of the PNM for nuclear proliferation. For some critics, the nuclear submarine or the uranium enrichment for the civilian program could conceal the diversion of nuclear materials for weapons production. For others, Brazil's behavior in international non-proliferation institutions sets bad precedents. (Note: "Some international observers worry that Brazil will use its nuclear submarine program as a cover to divert nuclear materials for weapon production. But even those who trust Brazil’s intentions fear that Brazil is setting a dangerous precedent for other nations with nuclear aspirations by challenging existing nonproliferation norms". "Some international observers […] say that Brazil's achievement reinforces the notion that the non-proliferation regime is flawed, as it shows that a country can acquire a potentially useful military capability without ever violating the NPT's requirements". "External observers are puzzled by Brazil's nuclear submarine program (…) some ask whether Brazil's ultimate goal is to develop a latent nuclear weapons capability and whether the nuclear submarine project is the first step".)

=== Technical feasibility ===
Uranium enrichment technology is guarded worldwide as a state secret, since the same centrifuges used to supply power plants can, with small modifications, prepare material for nuclear weapons. No matter how inefficient the process, it can be repeated until a product with an enrichment level suitable for explosives is obtained. This applies to centrifuges in any country. By the late 1980s, physicist José Goldemberg was already stating that Aramar, after installing more centrifuges and expanding the cascade, would have the technical potential to enrich uranium to weapons grade; Luiz Pinguelli Rosa reached the same conclusion in 1990. In 2004, it was estimated that the Navy's centrifuges in Resende could produce U-235 for five or six implosion-type warheads per year. By 2014, that potential would have grown to 53 to 63 warheads. Brazil is a nuclear latent State—a country with the technical capability to develop nuclear weapons, without having pursued that possibility. (Note: "Brazil possesses one of the most advanced nuclear capabilities in Latin America and is one of very few states with the indigenous capability to produce fissile material necessary to build a nuclear weapon.")

The enrichment level of the uranium to be used in the submarine is significant. Fissionable material with less than 20% U-235 is called low-enriched uranium (LEU). Enriching uranium from 20% to 90%—the minimum level used in nuclear arsenals (Note: The mass required for the construction of a nuclear explosive is inversely related to the enrichment level. Below 20%, the size would be impractical, and below 6%, an explosive reaction would not occur.)—is much easier than enriching natural uranium up to 20%. Therefore, material in this range is called highly enriched uranium (HEU) and is subject to much stricter international monitoring. Civilian nuclear power plants typically use LEU enriched to 3–5%; in Resende, the INB enriches uranium up to 3.5%.

For nuclear propulsion, each country uses an enrichment level suited to its needs and technological capacity. In the 2010s, the navies of the United States, United Kingdom, Russia, and India used HEU, while France and China relied on LEU. The higher the enrichment level, the longer the reactor's refueling interval. In U.S. submarines, enriched to over 90%, the core lasts more than thirty years—effectively the vessel's entire service life. French Barracuda-class submarines, fueled at 4% to 8% enrichment, are designed for refueling every ten years. The choice of LEU helps ease concerns over nuclear proliferation.

In the Brazilian nuclear submarine, the enrichment level will not be classified information. In 2005, Odair Gonçalves, then president of CNEN, stated that the submarine would use fuel enriched to 18–19%. According to 2015 information, the Labgene would operate with uranium enriched to 4.3%. Two alternative reactor configurations were under consideration—one with 8–10% enrichment and another with 15–20%. All these levels fall within the LEU range, but Brazil does not rule out the possibility of operating with HEU in the future. Since this would likely require a new reactor, the matter is deferred to a more distant horizon.

=== Nuclear armament policy ===
In the early years of the PNM, certain military sectors favored the production of nuclear weapons. The actual projects originated from the Air Force rather than the Navy, and, according to Admiral Mauro César, the Navy never considered the natural combination of nuclear armament and propulsion—a ballistic missile submarine. Admiral Flores stated that the Navy opposed the Air Force's nuclear weapon projects but was not against nuclear latency, which enjoyed broader consensus in both military and diplomatic circles compared to the direct production of nuclear weapons. The belief was that latency would provide sufficient deterrence against potential opponents like Argentina.

The Brazilian Constitution restricts nuclear technology to peaceful purposes. Military leaders interpret a nuclear-powered submarine armed with conventional weapons as serving a peaceful purpose, since it deters potential adversaries from starting a war—a view they argue has precedent in international jurisprudence. When the Constitution was enacted, doubts remained about the PNM's intentions. In 1989, Luiz Pinguelli Rosa noted the prevailing concern that "behind the submarine comes the nuclear bomb". The following year, an editorial in Folha de S. Paulo referred to the "unknowns and speculations" surrounding Aramar's ability to enrich uranium to weapons-grade levels. In 1990, Admiral Maximiano da Fonseca claimed, "Brazil can already build the atomic bomb", but added, "that is not in the country's interest".

Even after Brazil ratified the Nuclear Non-Proliferation Treaty (NPT) in 1998, international suspicion persisted. In 2004, CNEN President Odair Gonçalves dismissed "unfounded speculation" about the Resende plant's capacity to produce weapons-grade uranium. The continuous military involvement in the nuclear program has also been cited as a source of distrust. In 2010, Hans Rühle, a former German Defense Ministry official, argued that Brazil's ambitions for international stature and its "relations with Iran" hinted at a nuclear weapons program behind the submarine project. Since 1998, some Brazilian politicians have criticized the abandonment of the nuclear option, but there remains a broad consensus to maintain this stance.

=== Control mechanisms ===
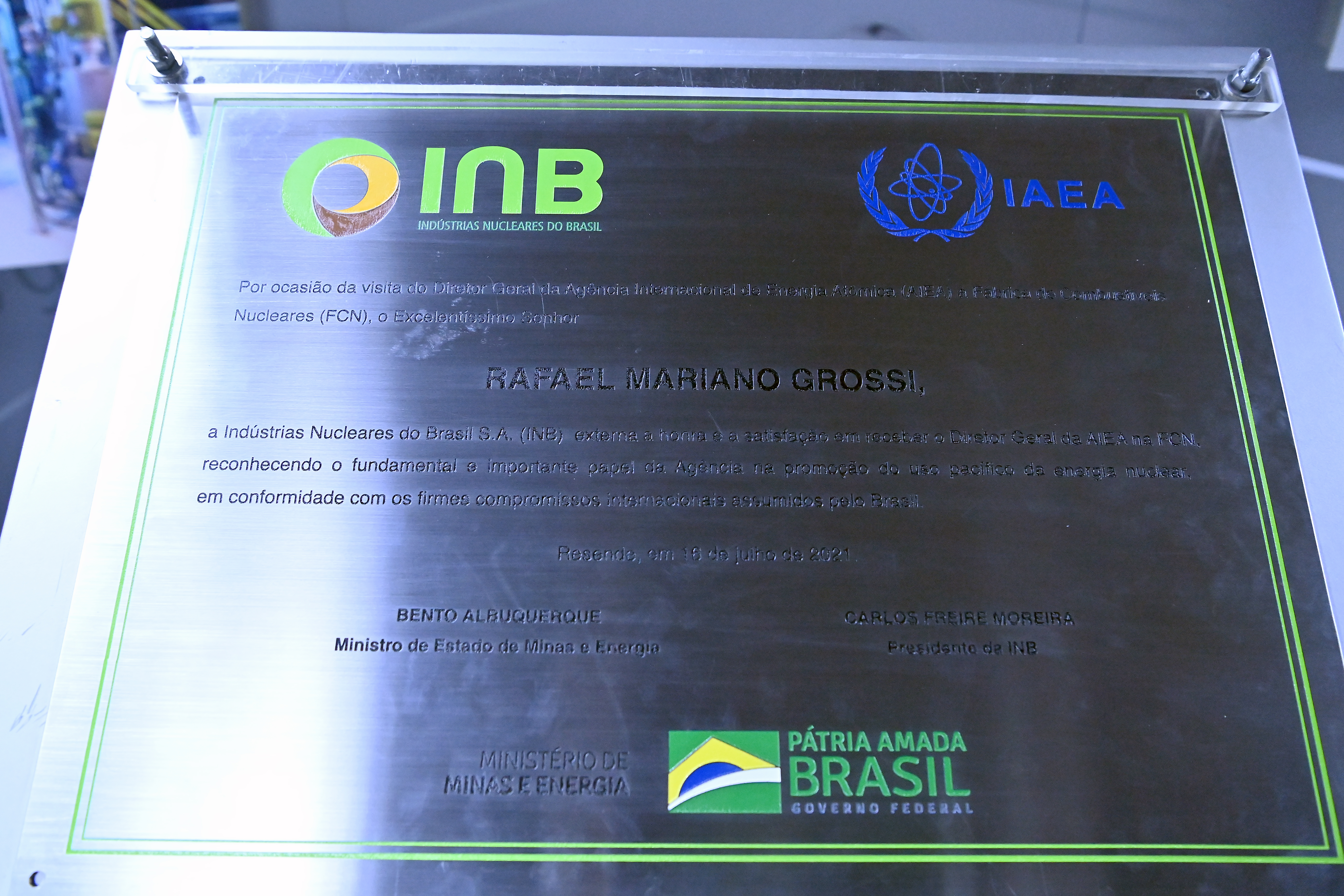
Commemorative plaque of the official visit of the IAEA Director to the Nuclear Industries of Brazil

Brazil is mindful of its respectability within the international nuclear community. Its nuclear program is subject to IAEA safeguards, ABACC inspections, and the scrutiny of a free press. As reported in the press in 2003, IAEA inspectors "have cameras installed in Iperó and Resende and have access to records of the movement of every gram of uranium extracted in the country, from the mine to the reactors in Angra dos Reis". According to Admiral Othon, Brazil has already declared all its nuclear facilities, including military ones, and is one of the few countries to allow IAEA visits to military facilities. However, it still needs to certify the fuel and negotiate a new safeguards system for the reserves to be used in the future nuclear submarine.

The Brazilian government resists some of the inspectors' demands, prompting intrigue and international suspicion. Brazilian representatives believe the country has already made sufficient concessions. Historically, the country has had a long involvement, but also criticisms, with non-proliferation institutions and treaties. It signed the NPT but refused, even under U.S. pressure, to sign the Additional Protocol to its IAEA safeguards agreement, which would increase inspectors' access to its nuclear facilities. The official stance is that there will be no accession without reciprocal disarmament by nuclear powers, continuing the long-standing accusations that the NPT is unfair and denies technology to developing countries. According to Luiz Felipe Lampreia, Minister of Foreign Affairs under the Fernando Henrique Cardoso administration, the Navy's position was what prevented Brazil's ratification of the Additional Protocol.

IAEA inspectors in Aramar agreed that the Navy could cover the centrifuges with panels. When they visited the same centrifuges at the INB plant in Resende, the same concealment measure was in place. It would not be impossible to connect the centrifuges to a clandestine storage site, but inspectors do not need access to the machines to measure the material entering and leaving the system and to calculate the difference. Every enrichment plant has a discrepancy, and the question is how much is considered acceptable: the production scale in Resende is much greater than in Aramar. The Brazilian government claimed that the concealment was necessary to protect industrial secrets. The IAEA ultimately accepted the partial covering of the machines, but suspicions remained abroad regarding the reasons for secrecy; for some, Brazil wanted to hide a foreign origin of its technology.

The formal request to negotiate safeguards for the submarine fuel was made in June 2022 and may run into objections from the major powers. As for the fuel certification, Brazil has already sought assistance—unsuccessfully—from the U.S. and Russia. Rafael Grossi, IAEA Director General, told the Brazilian press in 2024 that the negotiations could be concluded within five years, but Brazil would have to abandon its historical opposition to detailed inspections. "Having a nuclear submarine is legitimate. If the country wants one, it must reach an agreement with the IAEA, which will be very strict in the inspection regime. I need to provide guarantees to the international community". On the positive side, he projected that Brazil would face less resistance than the Australian nuclear submarine, to which China has already expressed reservations.

According to Admiral André Luís Ferreira Marques, director of the CTMSP in 2016, Brazil will be the first country in the world to subject a mobile nuclear facility to international safeguards. The fact that the submarine will spend months at sea, far from inspectors, is in itself considered a risk. Normally, IAEA inspectors would verify the fuel before it is loaded into the reactor, and the reactor would then be sealed. The IAEA would be notified in advance of the submarines' arrival in port to verify the integrity of the seals. From Brazil's perspective, the challenge is to dispel suspicions without revealing secrets. The government fears that the Additional Protocol would allow sudden inspections, disrupting the routine of military facilities and facilitating leaks of sensitive information. IAEA access to the production chain could reveal the design secrets of Brazilian centrifuges and even disturb private companies unrelated to the nuclear program on the grounds that they are suppliers.

Brazil is planning to invoke the provision of its safeguards agreement that provides for "special procedures" that exclude nuclear material from routine safeguards while in use for nuclear propulsion, under "arrangements" to be agreed between Brazil and the IAEA. (Note: "Brazil is the first non-nuclear weapon state to test the long-discussed "loophole" in the Non-Proliferation Treaty (INFCIRC/153, Article 14) that allows non-nuclear weapon states to remove nuclear materials from International Atomic Energy (IAEA) safeguards for nonexplosive military nuclear activities such as naval propulsion". INFCIRC/153 is the framework for individual agreements between the IAEA and NPT state parties. Brazil's Comprehensive Safeguards Agreement with the IAEA is in INFCIRC/435, whose Article 13 is similar to Article 14 of INFCIRC/153. INFCIRC/435 explicitly covers nuclear propulsion and does not establish a withdrawal of nuclear material from the safeguards system. Rather, special procedures for this material would be negotiated with the IAEA.) If the minimum duration of the exemption were the refueling interval (three and a half years or more), Brazil could convert HEU before the IAEA even suspected. Information published in the Nonproliferation Review in 2015 indicated that Brazil would only invoke the exemption while the fuel was on board the ships and would probably grant inspectors direct or remote access to the reactor during refueling. Brazilian authorities were optimistic about allowing inspections without leaking military secrets, and the problem was seen as more technical than political. There were, however, concerns about the precedent that would be set and the loss of credibility of the system if special exemptions were granted to Brazil. According to Rafael Grossi, a separate protocol for Brazil is theoretically possible, but "in reality, it is almost an academic debate".
