= Parallel Nuclear Program =

The Parallel Nuclear Program, officially the Autonomous Nuclear Technology Program (Portuguese: Programa Autônomo de Tecnologia Nuclear; PATN), was a Brazilian initiative to master the technology of the nuclear fuel cycle, developed separately from the "official" nuclear program established by the Brazil–West Germany nuclear agreement and therefore "parallel". Established in 1979, during the military dictatorship, it involved the National Nuclear Energy Commission (CNEN) and the ministries of the Navy, Army, and Air Force, under the coordination of a general secretariat linked to the president of Brazil. The PATN was created under secrecy and was immune to the international safeguards and inspections applied to the "official" program. It became public at the end of the dictatorship, in 1985, and was dismantled and unified with the civilian program under the Collor administration, symbolically marked by the ceremony closing the nuclear weapons test site at Serra do Cachimbo in September 1990.

Civilian and military research institutes had been developing nuclear activities in Brazil since the 1950s. The PATN coordinated these efforts to arrive at an alternative to Brazil's frustrations with the agreement with Germany. Officially, it aimed to "develop national competence in order to enable the broad use of nuclear energy, allowing for naval propulsion and the production of nuclear explosives for peaceful purposes". According to press reports in 1990, congressional investigations of the PATN found that the Institute for Advanced Studies had designed two nuclear weapons. Some research on nuclear weapons took place under the PATN, and there were military factions favorable to their production, but this was not the program's focus. The prevailing view among military officers and diplomats was that a latent capability to militarize enriched uranium would suffice to deter potential adversaries - namely Argentina - from obtaining a comparable bomb.

Each of the three Armed Forces branches pursued a different path to uranium enrichment: the Navy with Project Cyclone, based on ultracentrifugation, aimed at a nuclear submarine (Project Remo); the Army with Project Atlantic, focused on the production of graphite and plutonium; and the Air Force with Project Solimões, based on laser enrichment, intended to produce nuclear explosives for peaceful purposes and to supply energy for satellites. CNEN managed the Procon, Celeste, and Metallurgy projects for the production of uranium compounds, fuel reprocessing for plutonium production, preparation of metallic uranium, and radiometric and environmental control. Among the military programs, only the Navy's succeeded and survived the demise of the PATN, becoming involved in the civilian nuclear sector and continuing the nuclear submarine project. According to José Goldemberg, Secretary of Science and Technology under the Collor administration, in 1990 the Army's program was still at a rudimentary stage, and the Air Force's, although somewhat more advanced, achieved "no more than what you would expect from a master's student in the United States".

== See also ==
- Brazil and weapons of mass destruction
- Brazilian Navy Nuclear Program
