= Malheiros =

Malheiros is a surname, and may refer to:

- Christian Malheiros (born 1999), Brazilian actor
- Sabrina Malheiros (born 1979), Brazilian singer-songwriter
- Tania Malheiros, Brazilian journalist
