= Matias Spektor =

Brazilian professor

- Born: June 22, 1977 (age 49); Rosario, Argentina
- Education: University of Brasília (BA, MA) Oxford University (MSc, DPhil)
- Occupations: Professor of Politics and International Relations, Dean and Founder of the School of International Relations at FGV
- Employer: Fundação Getulio Vargas (FGV)
- Known for: Research on Brazilian foreign policy, Global South politics, nuclear proliferation
- Website: https://www.matiasspektor.com/

Matias Spektor is Professor of Politics and International Relations and Dean of the School of International Relations at Fundação Getúlio Vargas (FGV) in São Paulo, which he founded. FGV is one of Brazil's leading private universities and one of Latin America's major centers for policy research. Born in Rosario, Argentina, he grew up in the Brazilian state of Bahia and in Brasília. He holds a B.A. and a Master's in International Relations from the University of Brasília, and a Master's and Doctorate from the University of Oxford (2007).

Spektor is the author of several books on the foreign relations of Brazil and Brazil–United States relations, including Kissinger e o Brasil (2009), Azeredo da Silveira: um depoimento (2010), 18 Dias: quando Lula e FHC se uniram para conquistar o apoio de Bush (2014), and The Origins of Nuclear Cooperation (2015). He has published in international academic journals including Nature Communications, International Studies Quarterly, the Journal of Peace Research, Global Environmental Politics, the Journal of Global Security Studies, the Journal of Democracy, Cold War History, and The Nonproliferation Review, and is a regular commentator in outlets such as The New York Times, the Financial Times, and Foreign Affairs. From 2012 to 2019 he was a foreign policy columnist for Folha de S.Paulo.

He has held visiting fellowships at the Council on Foreign Relations, the Woodrow Wilson International Center for Scholars, King's College London (Rio Branco Chair in International Relations, 2013–2014), the London School of Economics, the Princeton Institute for International and Regional Studies, the Carnegie Endowment for International Peace (2022–2023), and the Georgetown Americas Institute.

He is a council member of the Brazilian Center for International Relations (CEBRI) and a member of the Inter-American Dialogue.

== Justice Stephen Breyer Lecture ==
In April 2024, Spektor delivered the 10th annual Justice Stephen Breyer Lecture on International Law at the Brookings Institution, on the future of the rules-based international order amid renewed strategic competition. An essay adapted from the lecture was later published by Brookings.

== Foreign Affairs ==
Spektor is a frequent contributor to Foreign Affairs. He has also appeared as a guest on the magazine's video series, The Foreign Affairs Interview.

== Broadcast and long-form interviews ==
Spektor is a recurring guest on Brazilian television and podcast programs discussing international affairs, including Reconversa, hosted by Reinaldo Azevedo and Walfrido Warde, and Ponto a Ponto, with journalist Mônica Bergamo and political scientist Antonio Lavareda. He has also been interviewed on Reimagining World Order, a research podcast of the Reimagining World Order community at Princeton's Institute for International and Regional Studies (PIIRS), directed by G. John Ikenberry, which described him as one of the leading IR scholars of the Global South.
