= Tania Malheiros =

Brazilian journalist

Tania Malheiros is a Brazilian journalist, who won an Esso Journalism Award in 1997 in the category of Scientific, Technological and Ecological Information.
