= José Goldemberg =

Brazilian physicist (born 1928)

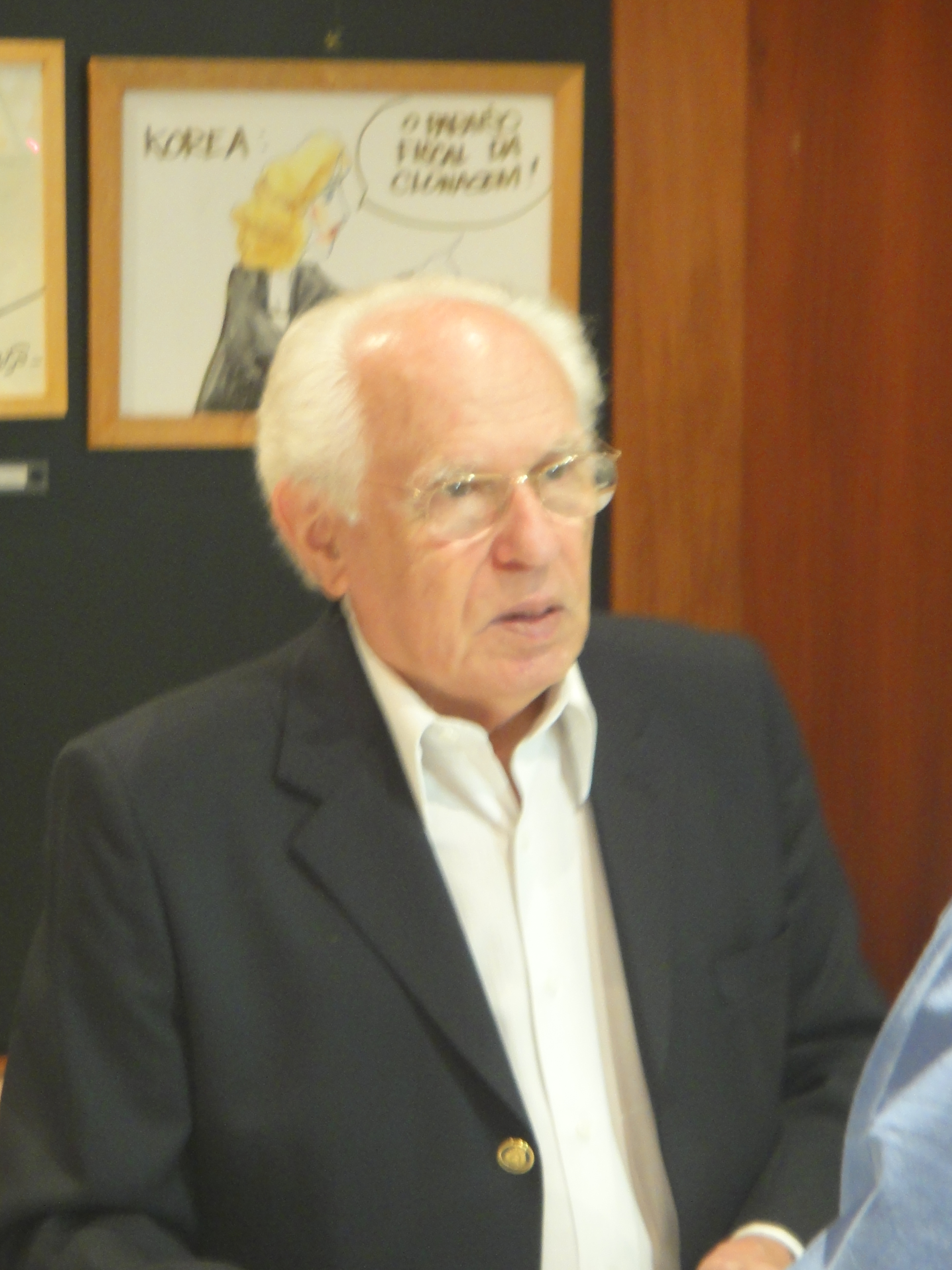
José Goldemberg

José Goldemberg (born in Santo Ângelo, May 27, 1928) is a Brazilian physicist, university educator, scientific leader and research scientist. He is a leading expert on energy and environment issues.

Goldemberg earned his Ph.D. in physical science from the University of São Paulo where he served as rector and full professor from 1986 to 1989. From 1983 to 1986 he directed the Energy Company of the State of São Paulo. From 1990 to 1992 he served the federal government in various capacities: as the Secretary of State for Science and Technology he modernized the information systems; as interim Secretary of the Environment he administered Brazil's participation in the 1992 Earth Summit in Rio de Janeiro; and as Minister of Education he prepared the proposal to Congress resulted in autonomy for federal universities. He has authored many technical papers and books on nuclear physics, environment, and energy and has served as president of the Brazilian Association for the Advancement of Science. Goldemberg also served as chairman of the editorial board (1998–2000) and a lead author of the UNDP World Energy Assessment.
