= Submarine Development Program =

Brazil - France partnership

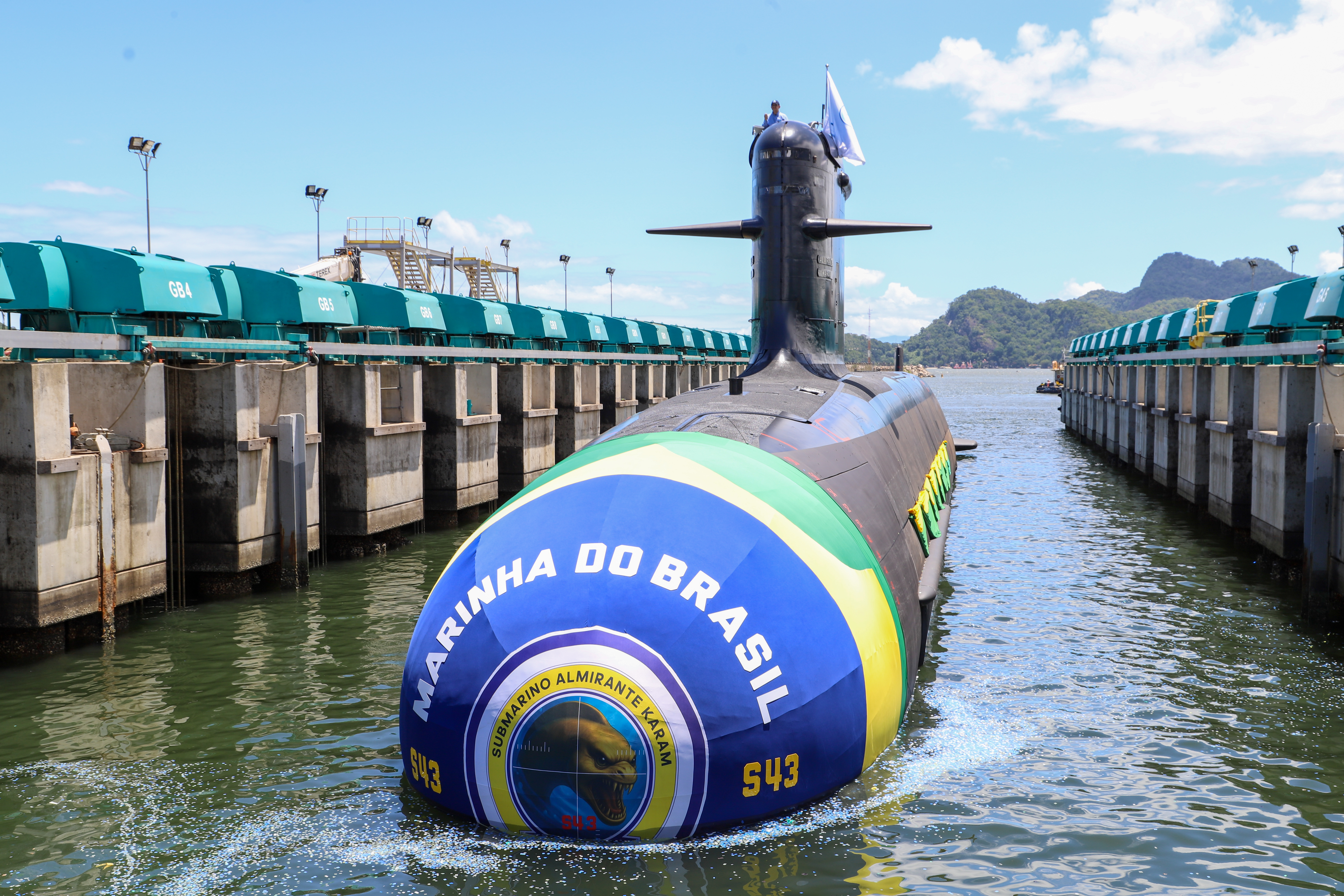
Launch of the program's fourth submarine, Almirante Karam, in 2025

The Submarine Development Program (PROSUB) is a partnership signed between Brazil and France in 2008, with the objective of transferring technology for the manufacture of military vessels. It is a component of the Brazil's Defense Strategy to develop the country's naval power with the production of four conventional submarines (diesel-electric propulsion) and the first Brazilian nuclear-powered submarine. The program will make Brazil one of the few countries to have nuclear technology, alongside the United States, Russia, France, the United Kingdom, China, and India.

Although the program began in 2008 with the goal of providing the Brazilian Navy with a "large naval force," it dates back to the 1970s when the Navy began seeking to master nuclear energy. In order to shorten the development time of such a program, Brazil sought partners in other countries in the hope of establishing a partnership in which technology and knowledge could be transferred for the construction and maintenance of modern submarine vessels. France was the country that made itself available for the deal, and several points were signed, which together culminate in the construction of four conventional submarines and one nuclear submarine.

In addition to the construction of the submarines, the PROSUB also foresees the construction of a complex called the Shipyard and Naval Base. This is where the submarine sections will be joined. This complex will also be responsible for installing the nuclear reactor for the first nuclear-powered submarine, Álvaro Alberto. The justification given by the Navy is that it is necessary to guarantee the protection of the Blue Amazon against any attempts to claim this territory and/or its resources. According to the Brazilian Navy, submarines (especially the nuclear one) are fundamental to dissuade these claims.

The submarines coming from the program will be used to patrol the Blue Amazon and Brazilian coastal waters. Currently the first two conventional submarines (S Riachuelo (S40) and S Humaitá (S41)) are already being tested, while two others are under construction. As for the nuclear-powered submarine, the Álvaro Alberto, it will have the function of patrolling the deepest Brazilian territorial waters, since its autonomy will only be limited by the amount of supplies stored, and a replica of the nuclear reactor that will be installed in the submarine is already being tested.

== History ==
=== Background ===
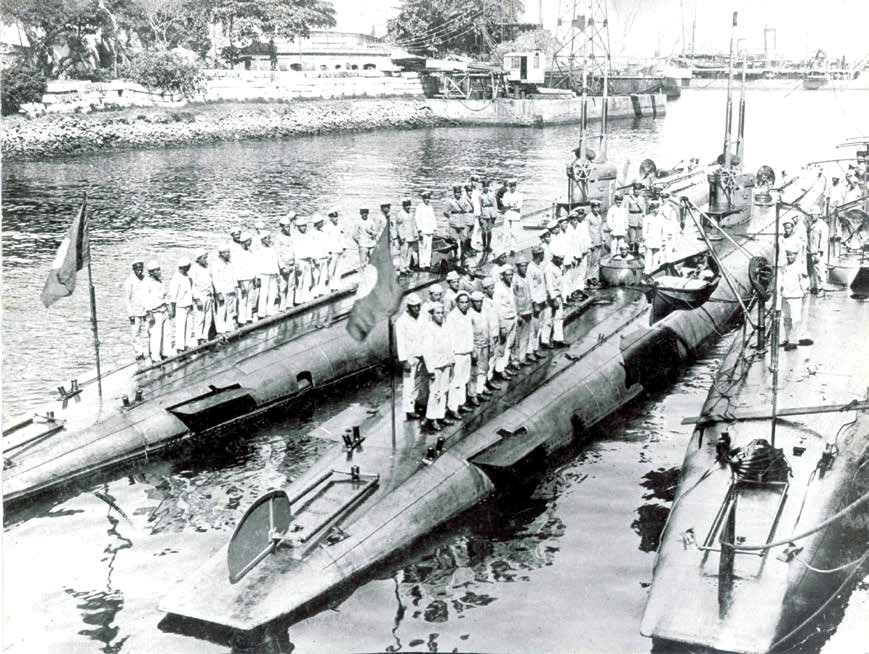
The three Foca-class submarines with their crews

At the end of the 19th century, the Brazilian navy was going through difficult times and was outclassed by the military forces of Argentina and Chile. At the beginning of the 20th century, the military powers of the time saw the submarine becoming an effective weapon of war, but Brazil did not have the capacity to build its own. Beginning in 1891, voices such as that of then Lieutenant Felinto Perry were heard promoting a naval campaign to acquire submersibles for Brazil. In the 1900s, the Brazilian navy strove to elevate itself before the South American countries; an ambitious naval investment led to several vessels being purchased, including three submarines from Italy. The first three submarines of the Brazilian Navy, the F1, F3 and F5 of the Foca class, would essentially act in the training and instruction of Brazilian crews, and shortly after their arrival in Brazil the Submersible Flotilla (as the Submarine Force was then called) was created. The Italians continued to be the source of the Brazilian submarine force, and in 1929 the Humaytá arrived in Brazil. Shortly thereafter, in 1933, when the old Foca-class submarines were taken out of service, the Submarine Force was deactivated, leaving the Brazilian military with only one submarine. In 1937, a new class of submarines was incorporated into the Navy, the Tupy, with three submarines built in Italy: the Tupy, Tymbira and Tamoyo, and the Submarine Force was reactivated. These submarines would participate in World War II in the training of convoy escorts and in the training of anti-submarine tactics for surface units and aircraft.

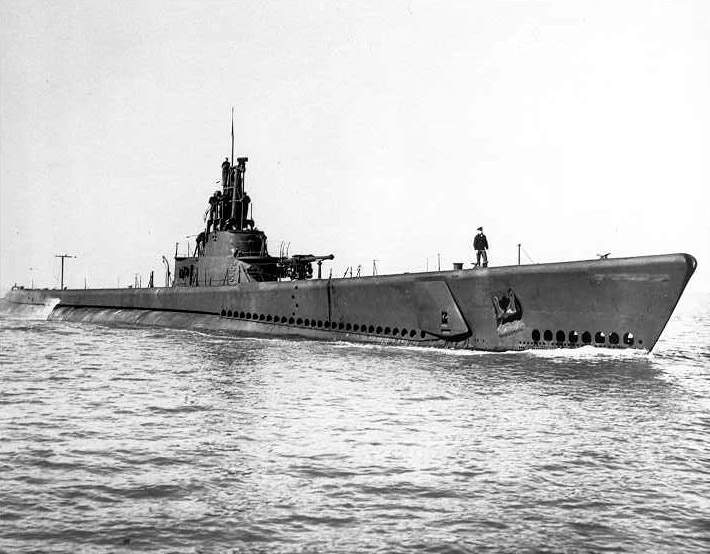
The first submarine named Riachuelo (S-15)

At the end of World War II, Brazil had positioned itself on the side of the victorious allies, and Italy, which had fought on the side of the Axis powers, was no longer able to continue supplying Brazil with the submarine weapons the Brazilian Navy needed. Having strengthened the relationship with the United States during the war, the country became the submarine supplier. In the post-war period, through the Military Assistance Program, from which surplus material from the war could be obtained at special prices, including boats and parts, Brazil reinforced its submarine naval power with the acquisition, from the end of the 1950s of two Gato-class submarines (S Humaitá (S-14) and S Riachuelo (S-15)), five GUPPY II-class submarines (S Guanabara (S-10), S Rio Grande do Sul (S-11), S Bahia (S-12), S Rio de Janeiro (S-13), and S Ceará (S-14)), and two GUPPY III-class submarines (S Goiás (S-15) and S Amazonas (S-16)), for a total of 11 submarines.

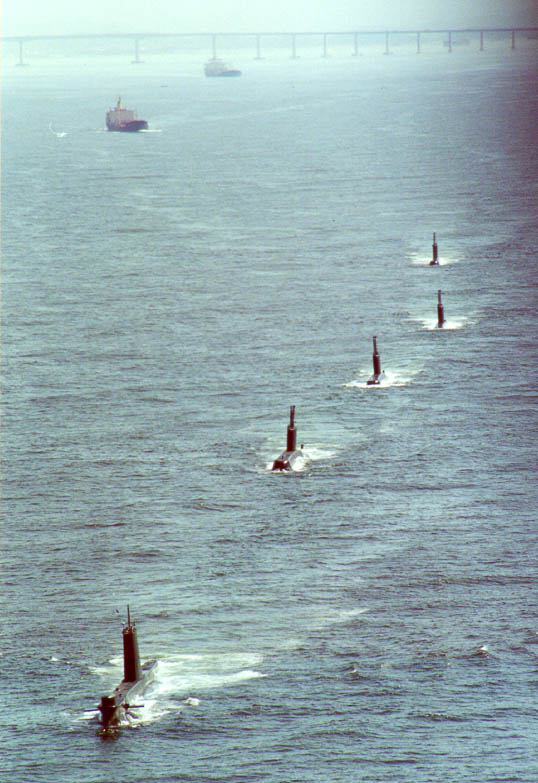
Submarines of the Brazilian Navy before the creation of PROSUB

In 1967, the 10-Year Renewal Program for Floating Resources was approved, which aimed to renew and strengthen the Navy and included six submarines. An interesting aspect of this program was also the nationalization of means, or the reduction of the level of dependence, through the local manufacture of components and parts; even so, Brazil still did not have the capacity to build its own submarines, and the obstacles placed by the United States in the supply of modern sonars and rocket launchers led the Navy to look to Europe. Therefore, three Oberon-class submarines were ordered from England, the S Humaitá (S-20), S Tonelero (S-21), and S Riachuelo (S-22). The search for the national capacity to produce these means led the Navy in the late 1970s to start thinking about a new naval program with a greater focus on the possibility of regional conflicts, directing its power to defense but this time with a greater focus on offense. In 1979, Admiral Maximiano Eduardo da Silva Fonseca took command of the Navy and managed not only to launch what would be the Navy Nuclear Program but also to sign a contract for technology transfer and technical capability with the German shipyard HDW, leading to the construction of submarines in Brazil as the Tupi class, with the four submarines S Tupi (S-30), S Tamoio (S-31), S Timbira (S-32) and S Tapajó (S-33). The first submarine would be built in Germany, and the others in Brazil, after the necessary knowledge and skills were acquired during construction of the first one.

In the 1980s, the Navy Arsenal of Rio de Janeiro was designated by the Brazilian Navy as the submarine construction site and, in fact, was the target of investment in the training and qualification of its professionals and in the modernization and adaptation of its industrial facilities. The first submarine built entirely in the country was the Tamoio, which went to sea in 1994. In that decade, two other submarines were built locally, the Timbira and Tapajó. The Brazilian Navy and the Germans then signed, in 1995, contracts for the supply of materials and equipment for the construction of a fifth submarine, the S Tikuna (S-34), incorporating modifications worked on by Brazilian engineers and with several technological innovations, especially in power generation, the firing direction system, and sensors.

=== Beginning of the program ===
Although the Tikuna was launched in March 2005, in October of the same year the SMB-10 project was suspended by the Navy Command. This project had as its objective the construction of a 100% Brazilian conventional propulsion submarine of 2,500 tons. Overall, the project foresaw the production of six units in the Navy Arsenal of Rio de Janeiro. Since the 1970s, the Brazilian Navy has sought to master the complete nuclear fuel cycle and be able to build a nuclear-powered submarine. In order to shorten the time it would take to reach the goal, the Brazilian Navy decided to look for partners capable of building conventional and nuclear-powered submarines and that, at the same time, would agree to transfer technology so that Brazil could carry out its own projects. Later, France would be the only power willing to transfer technology to the Brazilian Navy, and would offer as a starting point its most modern line of conventional submarines, the Scorpène class. In 2007, President Luíz Inácio Lula da Silva visited the Navy Experimental Center, where the Navy had been developing for decades what would be a nuclear reactor for a future submarine, but always developing slowly due to budgetary constraints. With the visit, the President of Brazil announced the release of one billion reais over eight years in order to push the project forward once and for all. The money would also fund research grants, logistics, and maintenance.

S40 3D model

Starting in 2008, Brazil began a radical change in its military policy, with the objective of consolidating itself as the greatest power in Latin America. The National Defense Strategy, launched in 2008, established that Brazil should have a "naval force of stature"; from this would emerge the Submarine Development Program, a partnership with France for the transfer of technology and the construction of four conventional submarines and, initially, a nuclear-powered submarine, with a view to national production of more units by 2040. The four conventional submarines of the Riachuelo class would be produced in Brazil, and are expected to be built and launched between 2010 and 2020. In 2009, the development of the nuclear-powered submarine was announced. Construction was scheduled to begin in 2016, but was delayed until 2023. This submarine project is based on the Riachuelo-class submarines, only larger and with nuclear propulsion, which is being developed by Brazilian technicians, and is designed based on the experience acquired from the French.

=== Training ===
After the goals were stipulated, Technical Assistance and Brazilian training for the conception, design, manufacture, operation and maintenance of structures and the submarines themselves, with emphasis on the nuclear-powered submarine were planned. Therefore, a group of more than two hundred professionals from the Brazilian Navy and from the companies Itaguaí Construções Navais (ICN) and Nuclebrás Equipamentos Pesados (NUCLEP) was assembled and sent to France to receive the necessary training and instruction for the undertaking. Part of the training was initially conducted in Cherbourg, where the Brazilian engineers and technicians monitored the construction of the forward sections of the first PROSUB submarine, the S-BR1, which would become the S Riachuelo (S-40), and qualified in various types of procedures such as welding, forming of parts, manufacture of structures, and other processes applied to submarine construction.

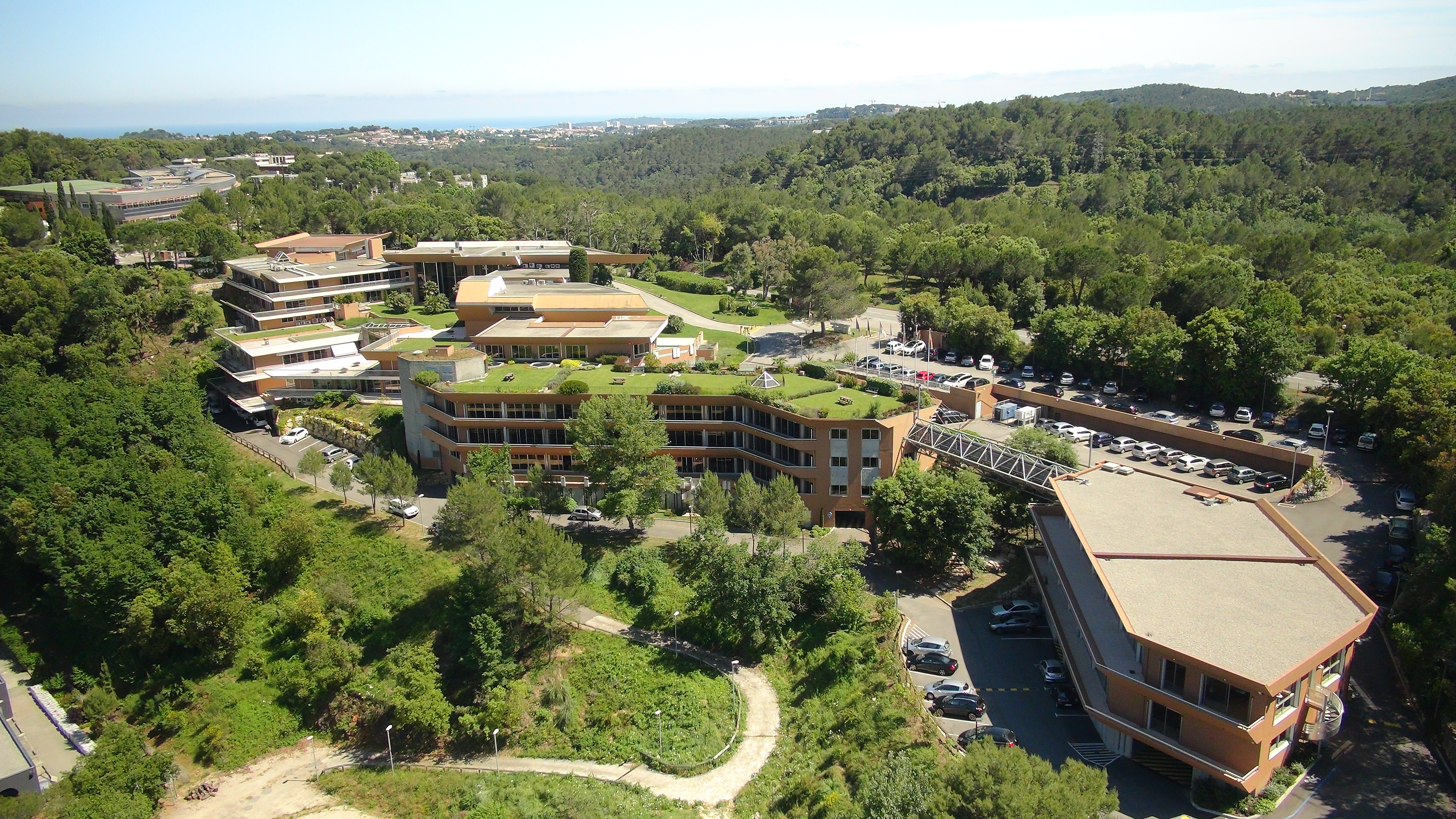
Sophia Antipolis Head Office

The Naval Group company built a submarine design school in Lorient, where 31 military engineers and civilian professionals from the Brazilian Navy have obtained a range of technical knowledge in submarine design; among the technological application exercises carried out at that time were a reduced design of a conventional submarine, a design of a nuclear-powered submarine, and initial studies about the interfaces of a nuclear submarine. These elements were formed over a period of more than two years. Other acquired skills include knowledge of submarine combat systems, through the technology park in Sophia Antipolis, where sonars are manufactured, in Ruelle, where the strategic equipment factory is located, and in Saint-Tropez, where production of a new type of torpedo to be used by French submarines and future Brazilian submarines is located.

After this training phase in France, the Brazilian Navy engineers returned to Brazil with the responsibility of passing on the knowledge acquired and to begin with the realization of the submarine project, relying, however, on the technical assistance of the company that trained them, this being one of the clauses of the contract. This team of trained personnel consists of two hundred engineers, and the team is expected to reach six hundred at the highest point of the nuclear-powered submarine project. Several French engineers and technicians are also accompanying the project in various aspects, such as in the manufacturing of the resistant hulls at NUCLEP, in the construction and activities of the Steel Structures Manufacturing Unit (UFEM), as well as in naval base works and shipyards. However, the development of the nuclear plant for the future nuclear submarine is the exclusive responsibility of the Brazilian Navy, and is not part of the PROSUB, and therefore no French citizen is present in this component of the program.

=== Submarines ===
==== Conventional propulsion submarines ====
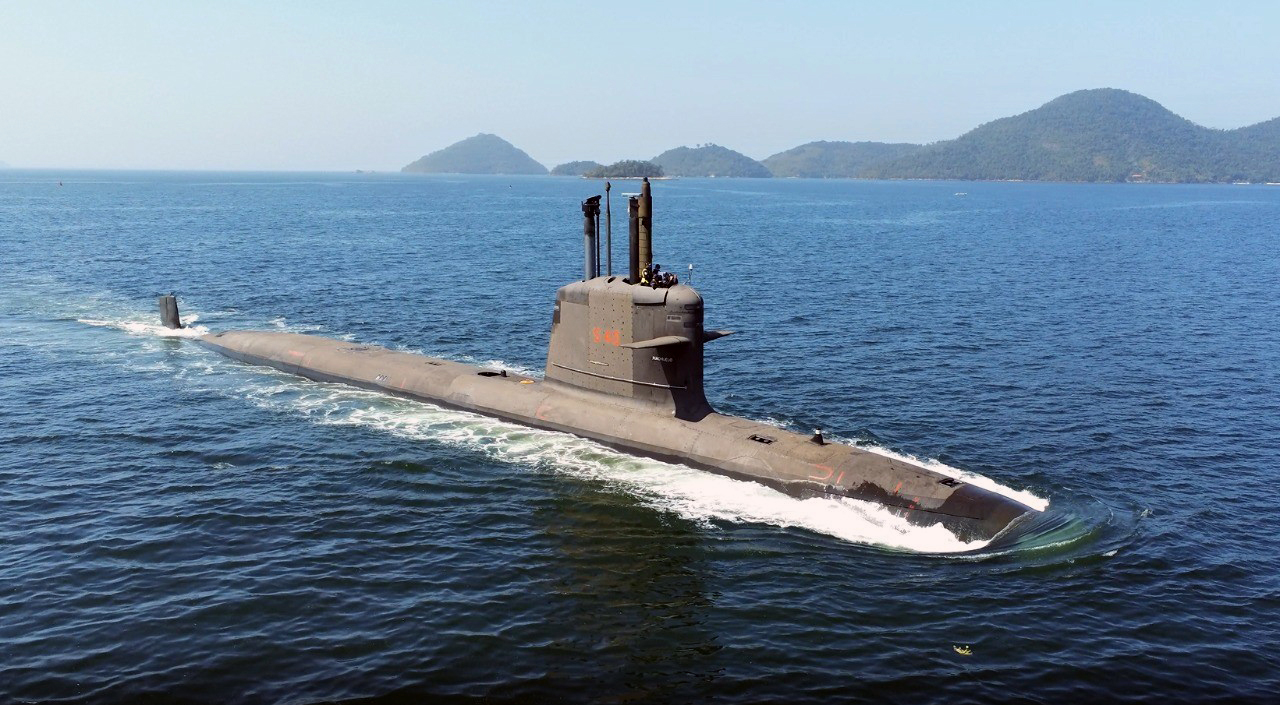
Propulsion test of the submarine S Riachuelo (S40)

PROSUB provides for the reinforcement of the Brazilian Navy with four modern conventional propulsion submarines. The four submarines, S Riachuelo (S-40), S Humaitá (S-41), S Tonelero (S-42) and S Angostura (S-43) will compose the Riachuelo class, being derived from the French Scorpène class. However, the Brazilian submarines have major differences in relation to the French class, such as greater length and draft. The Navy justifies this disparity by saying that:

the French model does not fully meet the requirements of the Brazilian Navy. With 8,500 km (5,300 mi) of coastline, the country requires a submarine capable of reaching the extremes, patrolling from north to south, and returning to its base without needing support. To cover greater distances, staying longer at sea, the submarine needs to be able to carry more fuel and supplies. And it is recommended that it also offer more comfort for the crew.

The goal, expected by the Navy, is the capacity of concealment, generating the surprise effect. This type of submarine can be detected by sound waves emitted by sonar, but since sound propagation is interfered by several factors, shadow zones are produced, where the boat cannot be detected because it is confused with its surroundings. On the other hand, these submarines could be equipped with an Air Independent Propulsion (AIP) system, which uses ethanol and oxygen to move a steam turbine, but Brazil chose not to make use of this feature and instead opted for increased space for fuel, food, and additional bunks.

The concealment of diesel-electric propulsion submarines cannot be performed for a long time; periodically it will have to return to the surface, as it depends on atmospheric air to run the engine, recharge the batteries, as well as to refill the air from inside the station. Therefore, the parts are exposed and can be detected by radars, ships and aircraft. The submarines will have reduced mobility, with an average speed of 21 kn (39 km/h; 24 mph). The main use of these submarines is for patrolling the Brazilian coast, since their mobility and speed is reduced, making them unsuitable for the open sea for certain types of missions. With a displacement of two thousand tons, its length is 71.6 metres (234 ft 11 in), its beam measures 6.2 metres (20 ft 4 in), and its draft is up to 5.5 metres (18 ft 1 in). Diesel-electric propulsion will allow them to have an autonomy of up to 20,924 km (13,002 miles; 11,298 nmi).

So far two submarines have been completed. The Riachuelo completed construction in 2015 and was launched to sea in 2018, and its ceremony was attended by various authorities. In October 2021 it was already in the final stage of testing and it is expected to finish its tests still in 2021. The second completed submarine is the Humaitá, which was launched on December 11, 2020, is currently in the testing phase and is expected to finish its testing period in 2021 as well. In the long term, the Navy intends to have a force of fifteen units of these submarines.

The Brazilian Navy was not the only one to look to the French class to strengthen its power. The first buyer of submarines of this class was Chile, which in the late 1990s ordered two units to replace its two Oberon-class submarines. Next was Malaysia, which purchased two units, incorporated in 2009. India was the third buyer, signing a contract in 2005 for six units, which are also being built locally with technology transfer.

==== Nuclear-powered submarines ====
Álvaro Alberto SSN profile

The first nuclear-powered submarine was baptized SN Álvaro Alberto (SN-10), a tribute to Admiral Álvaro Alberto da Mota e Silva, who initiated the development of nuclear science in Brazil and was the founder of the National Council for Scientific and Technological Development. With nuclear propulsion, which will produce heat to vaporize the water used in turbines, the submarine will be able to stay underwater for an indefinite period of time and be used in deep waters, since its limitation is linked to the stock of supplies and the crew's physical and psychological stability. With great mobility power, it will reach speeds of 65.5 km/h (35.4 kn).

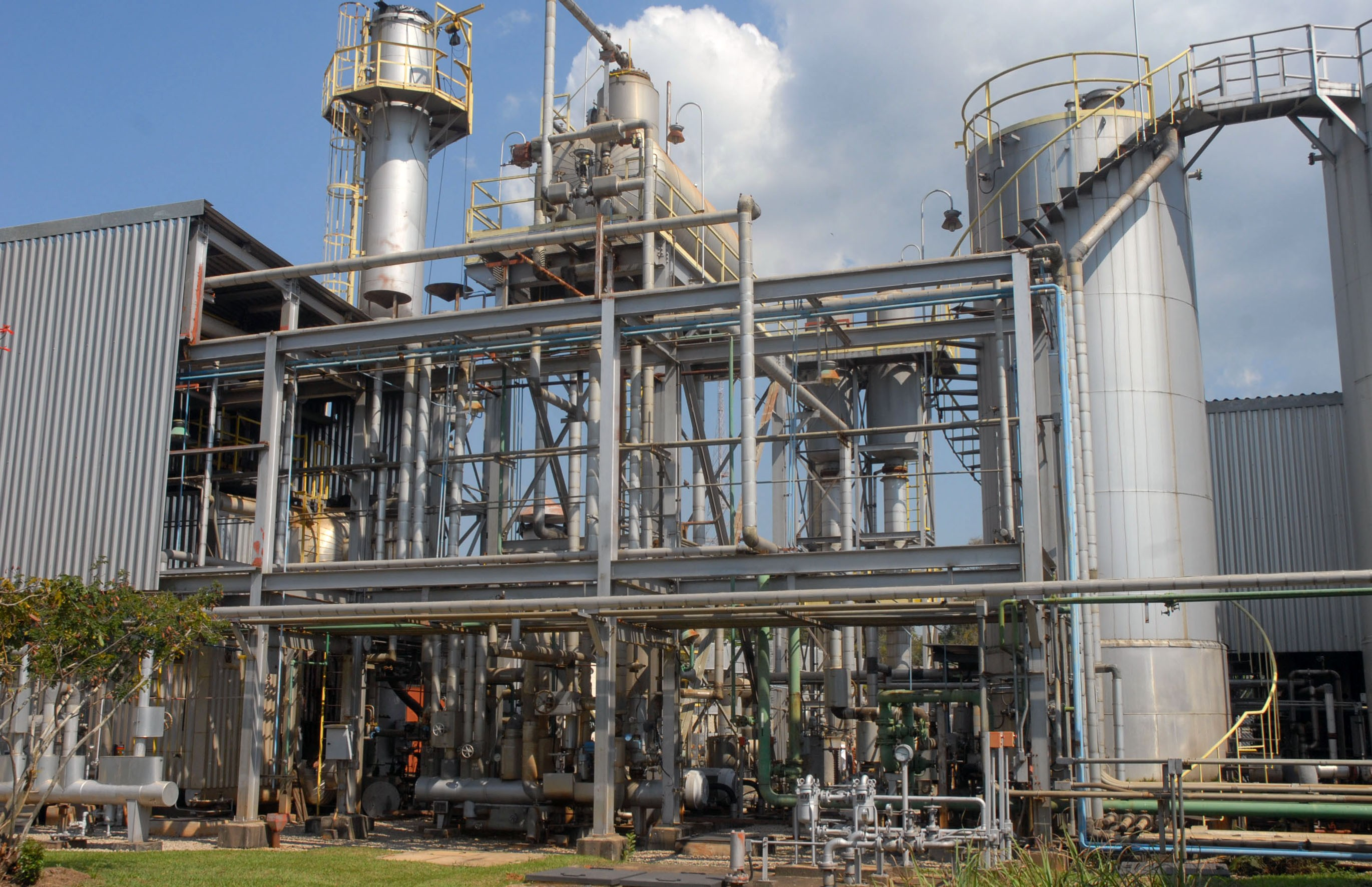
O Centro Experimental Aramar, onde são feitos os estudos com o material nuclear que comporá o reator nuclear

The announcement of the development of this submarine took place on August 27, 2009, and the project itself was started in July 2012 at the COGESN Technical Project Office at the Navy Technology Center in São Paulo (CTMSP); construction was scheduled to begin in 2016, but was delayed until 2023. In all, the Brazilian Navy intends to reinforce its fleet with six units of this submarine, with a design based on the Riachuelo-class submarines, only larger and with nuclear propulsion. Its nuclear propulsion was developed by Brazilian technicians, and was designed based on the experience acquired with the French; as for the nuclear plant, it is the sole responsibility of the Brazilian Navy, with no involvement from the French.

Some characteristics already disclosed of the SN-10 show that it will be 100 metres (330 ft) long, with a displacement of about 6,000 tons, and will be powered by 48 MW turbo-electric propulsion. The submarine will have an average speed of 24 kn (44 km/h; 28 mph) and the capacity to reach a depth of up to 350 metres (1,150 ft) with more than a hundred men. The nuclear reactor will provide the heat to create steam, which in turn will drive two turbines coupled to two electrical generators, one dedicated primarily to generate electricity for the propulsion electric motor, and the other to provide electricity for the submarine's other systems. Although the initial goal is a nuclear-powered submarine similar in appearance to the Scorpène class, but larger in size to house the nuclear reactor, one of the possibilities under study is that the hull of this submarine will be more similar to that of the new class of French nuclear-powered submarines, the Barracuda class. The first example of this class, the Suffren, built in France, launched in 2019 and commissioned in 2020, had its development monitored by Brazilian engineers.

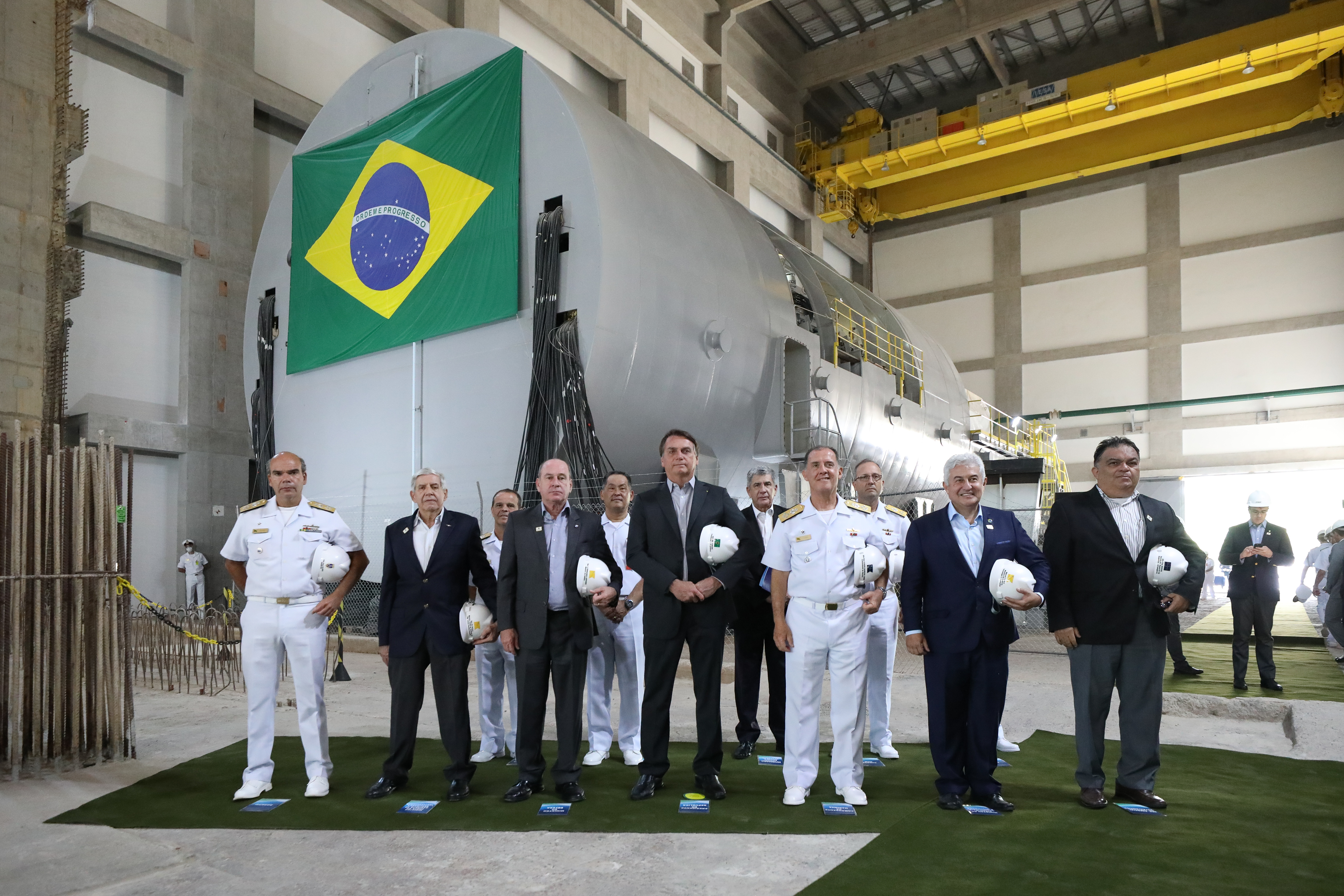
The President of Brazil, Jair Bolsonaro, visits the Laboratory of Nucleoelectric Energy Generation - LABGENE

The first stage of the project, called "Phase A" (Design and Feasibility Studies), started in July 2012 and was successfully completed in July 2013. The second, "Phase B", corresponding to the Preliminary Design, started in August 2013 and was successfully closed in January 2017. The conclusion of this phase allowed the drafting of the procurement contracts for the SN-BR Material Package and Construction. Therefore, making it possible to predict the overall cost for obtaining the submarine, it created the necessary conditions for the development of "Phase C," Detailed Design, the last phase before construction begins. A replica nuclear reactor has already been built, and is being used to test the reactor in simulated conditions similar to the operations that the future submarine is expected to have. According to some media this submarine is already under construction.

Although this project was announced in August 2009, part of it has been in development for decades. Brazil has had a nuclear program since the 1970s, and the Brazilian Navy has invested in building components in partnership with private companies, such as the nuclear reactor, condensers, pressurizers, and others. This effort culminates in Labgene, the first high-power nuclear reactor plant built in Brazil. Conceptually, it is a prototype with the capacity to generate the necessary energy to move a submarine and feed the submarine's other systems. Although it was produced on land, the Labgene seeks to reproduce and validate the conditions and test the operational situations that the submarine's nuclear reactor will experience. Although nuclear, it differs from those produced and used in nuclear powers such as the United States or France, which use high-enriched uranium, which would also be suitable for a nuclear bomb; the Brazilian reactor, on the other hand, will use low-enriched uranium, a factor that shows that the program is not going down a path with the aim of building a weapon, but only a reactor.

== Program goal ==
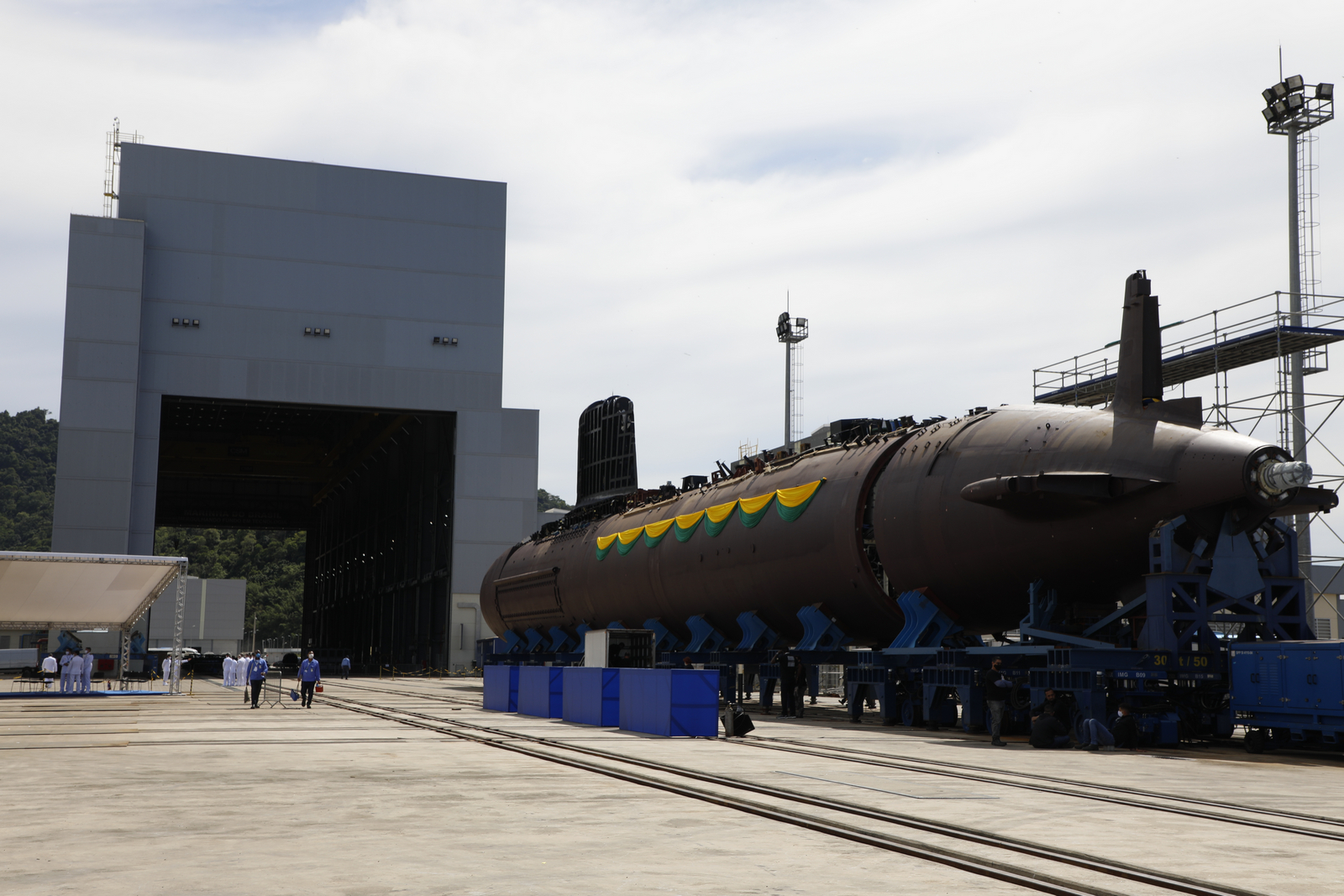
The S Humaitá (S-41) at the Madeira Island Submarine Base, during the Sailor's Day celebrations

The Submarine Development Program is expected to cost around 23 billion reais. By way of comparison, the Brazilian government invested (directly or through loans) in the construction of stadiums and infrastructure for the 2014 FIFA World Cup more than 25 billion reais. All this investment in a program is aimed at strengthening national military defense and ensuring the protection of national wealth from naval threats that emerge in the future; another benefit is that the program is already creating thousands of jobs, many of them high-level technical jobs. The main function of the Riachuelo-class conventional submarines will be to patrol Brazil's exclusive economic zone, while the Álvaro Alberto nuclear-powered submarine will be used mainly in open and deep waters. The Riachuelo-class submarines, on the other hand, are better suited for waters close to shore as they have reduced autonomy, a concern of the Brazilian Navy (especially after the disappearance of the ARA San Juan); this concern has led to the thought of building a tailor-made search and rescue vessel.

With PROSUB the Brazilian Navy will also reinforce its arsenal with new torpedoes. The French F21 torpedo will be added to the list of torpedoes already used by the Brazilian Navy, however these new torpedoes will be used exclusively by the new submarines foreseen in the program, while the remaining Brazilian Navy submarines will continue to use the American Mark 48. Another objective of the program, besides building four conventional submarines and one nuclear-powered submarine, is to build a naval base and two shipyards. The General Coordination of the Nuclear Propulsion Submarine Development Program (COGESN) is responsible for managing the PROSUB and ensuring the proper investment of funds. The target facilities for these investments are as follows:

- Steel Structures Manufacturing Unit (UFEM) - inaugurated on March 1, 2013, it was the first stage of the PROSUB for submarine construction. It has an area of 96,000 m^{2} (1,030,000 sq ft), of which 57,000 m^{2} (610,000 sq ft) is built area. It was built, according to the Brazilian Navy, strategically next to NUCLEP. This is where the conventional submarines were and are being built, and later, the first Brazilian nuclear-powered submarine will also be built here.
- Shipyard and naval base - the main building of the shipyard was inaugurated on December 12, 2014. Here the submarine sections will be joined and the propulsion for the nuclear-powered submarine installed. The naval base is composed of two poles, the north and the south.
- Radiological Complex (also called Aramar Experimental Center) - built under strict safety standards, it is even considered "tsunami resistant". This is where the nuclear fuel cycle is studied, among other studies related to nuclear propulsion, and where the nuclear reactor to be used by the first Brazilian nuclear-powered submarine will be built.

=== Blue Amazon ===
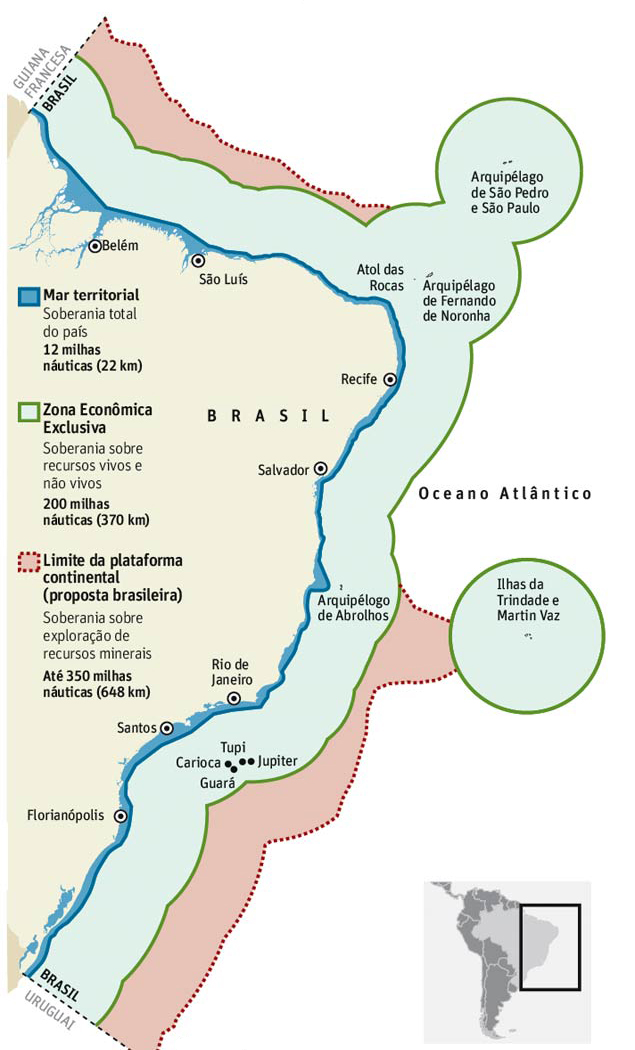
The current Blue Amazon area

With a large coastline of about 7,400 km (4,600 mi), Brazil has a strong connection to the sea. The coast is a source of mineral, energy and food riches, and is the route for 95% of the country's exports and imports; furthermore, 80% of the Brazilian population is less than two hundred kilometres (120 mi) from the coast. Hence the justification for the PROSUB, to protect these resources and this vital area. The program was developed as part of the Blue Amazon and the National Defense Strategy, and was created with the goal of providing a "large naval force" including several submarines (conventional and nuclear-powered). Brazil has, under its jurisdiction, about 3.5 million square kilometres (3.8×10^{13} sq ft) of maritime space. Within this area oil (90% of the national oil), natural gas (77% of the national gas), fish, among other resources, are extracted. Nickel, copper, cobalt and manganese reserves have also been discovered at a depth of 4,000 metres (13,000 ft). With such an abundant amount of resources, the Brazilian government began to fear that other countries might claim this territory, fundamental to the country's economy and sovereignty, then arising the need for defense and patrolling.

The United Nations Convention on the Law of the Sea, also known as the Law of the Sea, divides not only the Blue Amazon as well as any other ocean regions into the following areas:

- Territorial waters - the territory that runs from the coast of the country (in this case Brazil) to 22 km (14 miles; 12 nmi) ocean inside. The country has the right to control everything within this region, from the ocean floor to the local airspace.
- Contiguous zone - This is another 22 km (14 miles; 12 nmi) plus the Territorial waters) under the jurisdiction of the coastal country. It serves mainly as a means to ensure that naval illicit actions are curbed.
- Exclusive economic zone - extends up to 370 km (200 NM) from the lines agreed upon by the coastal country. The country has dominion over everything (whether living or inanimate) that is within this zone. However, the country can only use this region for economic purposes (fishing, energy generation and extraction of natural resources, etc.) and can only build in this zone.
- Continental shelf - must be established following the criteria of article 76 of the Law of the Sea. In this zone the country also has control over the natural or industrial resources (if any). The difference in this zone is that the state has full control over it, because if it does not use the resources it has the right to prohibit the extraction of others (private initiative).

== Infrastructure and economy ==
The Submarine Development Program intends to provide the Brazilian defense industry with state-of-the-art nuclear technology, a goal indicated in the National Defense Strategy. The realization of this program will also strengthen sectors of national industry and help in the economic development of the country. By prioritizing the acquisition of locally manufactured components for the submarines, the PROSUB stimulates the national industry. In addition to the five initial submarines (four conventional and one nuclear-powered), PROSUB contemplates the construction of a complex of industrial infrastructure and support to the operation of the submarines, which includes shipyards, a naval base and a Steel Structures Manufacturing Unit. The program also contemplates four areas in its rationale: social responsibility, environmental management, technological benefits, and nationalization.

=== Madeira Island Submarine Base ===
The Madeira Island Submarine Base (BSIM) was envisioned by the Ministry of Defence in the early 2010s to receive and continue the construction of the Navy's new submarines (planned under PROSUB) by the Brazilian company Itaguaí Construções Navais (ICN); the base was also designed to serve as the company's headquarters.

The base itself was inaugurated in 2020, but the first Brazilian Riachuelo-class submarine, S Riachuelo (S-40), had already been launched on December 14, 2018, and S Humaitá (S-41) was launched on December 11, 2020. Construction of the submarines S Tonelero (S42) and S Angostura (S43) began in 2017 and 2018, respectively. Since 2018 the base has hosted the construction of Brazil's nuclear submarine fleet, starting with the Alvaro Alberto. On July 12, 2021, the Brazilian Navy transferred the Brazilian Submarine Force Command (ComForS) to this base.

=== Social responsibility ===
From the moment it was decided that the program would be carried out and that an Industrial-Military Complex would be installed in the municipality of Itaguaí, it was clear that the Brazilian Navy would impact the development of the region where the project would be inserted. The complex itself is expected to host about five thousand military and civilian employee families. The fact that the Navy already has bases in other locations serves as a certainty in predicting the social and economic impact it will make in the region as a result of the insertion of these people in the area.

Even so, the Brazilian Navy, in partnership with the companies involved in the program, has been undertaking several actions aimed at improving the quality of life of the population of Itaguaí and its surroundings. Besides the employment, about which it is foreseen the creation of more than 22000 direct jobs and almost 40000 indirect ones, several projects and initiatives have been launched with the region's population, such as Environmental Education for the construction workers, the Alimento Justo Program that encourages family farming, the English on a Click Program aimed at teaching the English language, the Caia na Rede Program that seeks free digital literacy, a professional qualification program, among others.

=== Environmental management ===
The PROSUB has a Basic Environmental Plan, which covers the areas of direct and indirect influence of the project, through the promotion of monitoring and control of the quality of air, water, fauna, noise pollution, waste, among others. This plan stems from the Environmental Impact Study, establishing 46 projects, sub-projects, and actions focused on the environmental and socio-economic impact of the undertaking in the region where it is located. The actions taken range from the management of solid residues from the construction work on the complex to the monitoring of terrestrial and marine fauna due to the impact caused by the undertaking, and there is also the installation of various equipment to measure air quality or noise, all areas that may be impacted by the work on the Industrial-Military Complex. All reports are sent to the Brazilian Institute of Environment and Renewable Natural Resources (IBAMA), the licensing agency for the work, making sure that all the requirements established by environmental legislation are being fulfilled.

=== Technological benefits ===
One of the aspects that characterizes the PROSUB is technology transfer. This transfer will ensure that Brazil will have the capacity to design, build, operate and maintain its own submarines, both conventional and nuclear-powered. With the realization of the project, the development of the Defense Industrial Base is also fostered, which encompasses different sectors such as electronics, mechanics, electromechanics, and chemistry. On the other hand, the participation of universities and various research institutes leads to the dissemination of knowledge, so that it is not concentrated in a single area or with a single group.

The technologies that are involved in the Submarine Development Program do not have only restricted use in the military or naval environment, since it extends over several areas and encompasses various components, from the industrial infrastructure of shipbuilding to integrated control systems, as well as the development of laboratories, the construction of a nuclear plant and even the improvement of processes and management tools for complex projects.

=== Nationalization ===
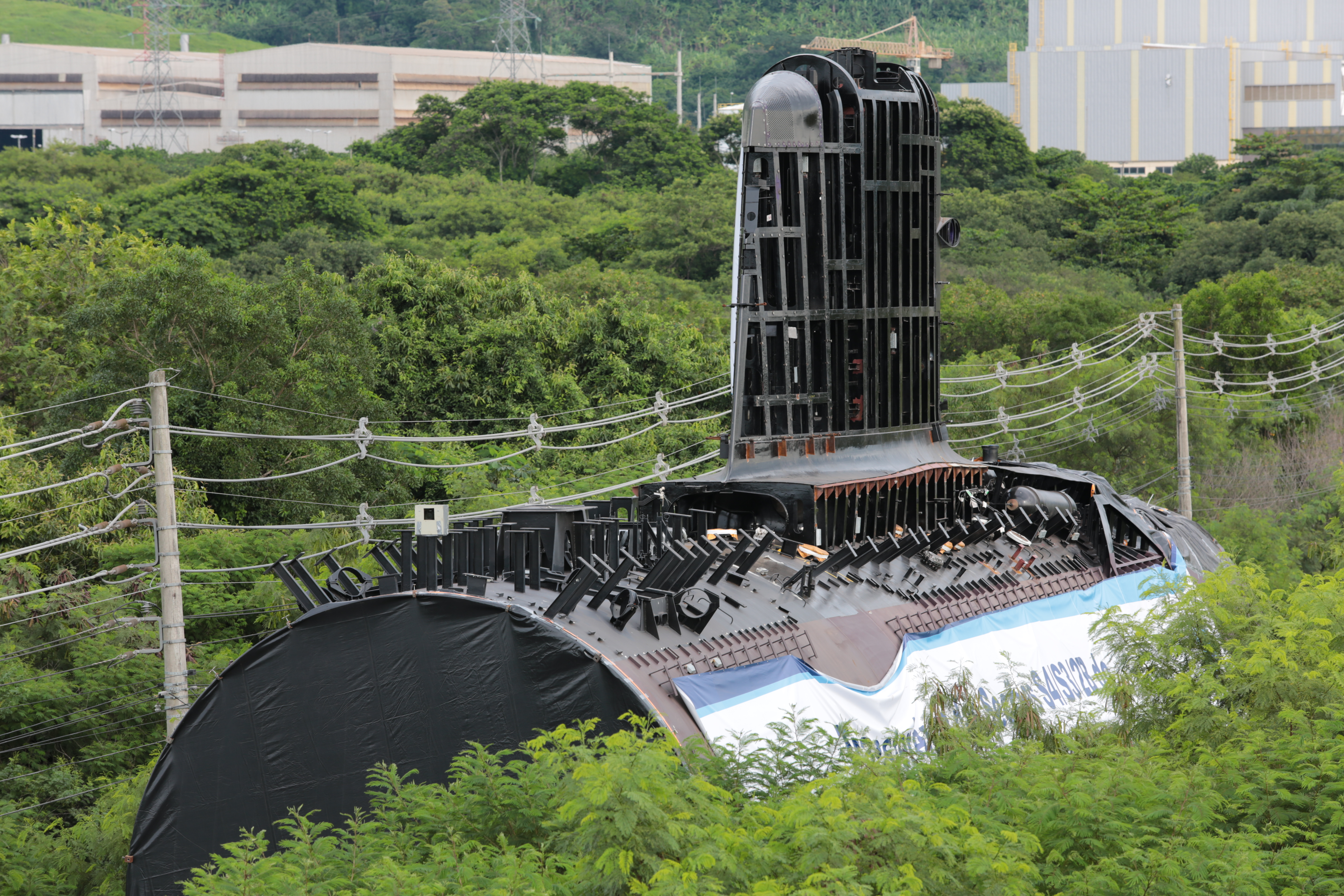
Transfer of sections of the submarine S Riachuelo (S40), the first submarine built in Brazil

According to the Brazilian Navy, the PROSUB can be considered one of the largest international contracts ever made by Brazil and also the largest industrial and technological training program in the defense industry. However, one of the program's main focuses was nationalization, from the construction of the steel structures factory to the maintenance of the submarines. The nationalization of the program's components encompasses around 104 subprojects and more than four hundred million Euros for company capacity building, while the order for systems, equipment and components for the construction of the conventional submarines is around one hundred million Euros, an amount considered the minimum for the nuclear-powered submarine. The management was carried out, in the first place, in a selection of what would be feasible to manufacture nationally. Next, the industrial segment was called in to evaluate what could be produced in Brazil. In some cases the target product was already available nationally, and in others similar products were found whose suppliers were willing to make a separate line with the specifications required by the Brazilian Navy.

For the construction of the Steel Structures Manufacturing Unit (UFEM), the shipyard and the naval base, more than 600 national companies were involved, with the guarantee of 95% nationalization of the components and systems. The number of suppliers interested in participating in the Submarine Development Program is extensive; they have absorbed knowledge and made investments not only to meet the needs of the Brazilian Navy but also with an eye to the future on the international market. Once trained, Brazil will no longer depend on external input for the construction of its submarines and may even export. Brazilian companies will know how to manufacture, and the Brazilian Navy will know how to design and build, giving a new strength to the Brazilian defense industry. The military area is not the only one to benefit; several technologies have already been successfully appropriated by a number of industries for civilian use, mainly in the chemical, mechanical and naval areas.

== Repercussion ==
Aware of the political and strategic implications that this agreement will have both in the South Atlantic and in the international system, France has agreed to transfer the technology to Brazil, which besides already being a hemispheric power, also has the status, below the Equator, of no other country with the ability to deter and deny the use of the sea to the enemy to the same extent. However, many see this quest for nuclear-powered submarines as quixotic; one foreign diplomat even declared that it was "a crazy indulgence from the Lula era". In 2021, when an agreement was announced between Australia and the United States and the United Kingdom to supply nuclear submarines to the Australians, there was renewed talk about the Brazilian nuclear-powered submarine project. The Economist considered the Brazilian project to be an "exaggeration" for protecting fish and guarding oil platforms, and alleged that conventional submarines, such as the Riachuelo class, would be better suited for coastal defense. The journalistic article also linked the survival of the program over the years to great figures in the Brazilian government.

== See also ==
- Military history of Brazil
- Military science
- Arms industry
- Military technology
- Brazil-France relations
- Nuclear activities in Brazil
