= Brazilian submarine Tonelero (S42) =

Brazilian submarine

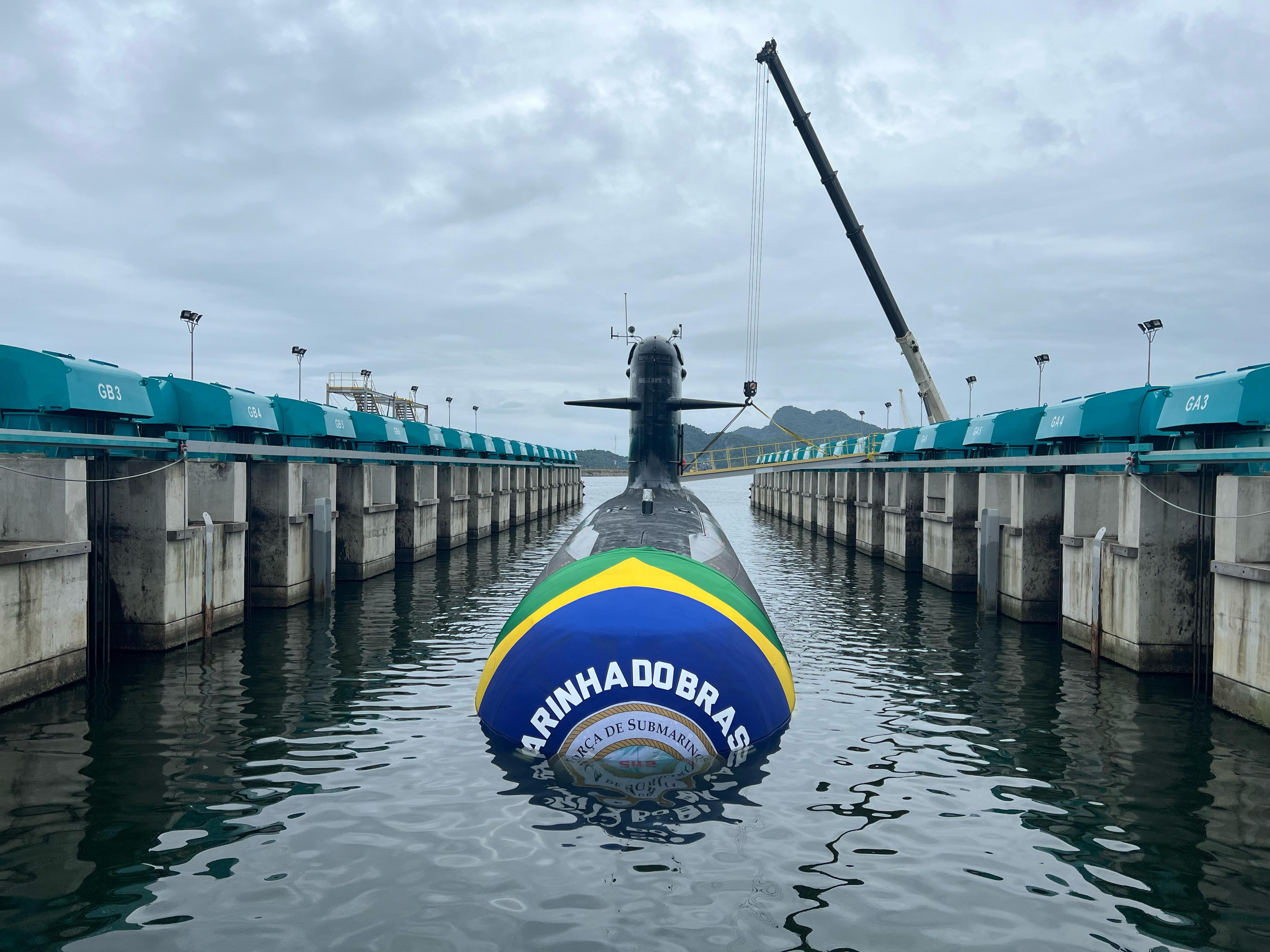
- Tonelero

History

Brazil
- Name: Tonelero
- Namesake: Battle of the Tonelero Pass
- Ordered: 23 December 2008
- Builder: ICN, Madeira Island, Itaguaí
- Laid down: 13 January 2015
- Launched: 27 March 2024
- Sponsored by: Rosângela Lula da Silva
- Commissioned: 26 November 2025
- Home port: Madeira Island
- Identification: MMSI number: 710501000; Callsign: PWTN; Pennant number: S42
- Status: Active

General characteristics
- Class & type: Riachuelo-class submarine
- Displacement: 1,900 t (1,900 long tons)
- Length: 70.62 m (231 ft 8 in)
- Beam: 6.2 m (20 ft 4 in)
- Draft: 5.8 m (19 ft 0 in)
- Propulsion: 4 × MTU 12V 396 SE84 diesels 1,500 hp (1,119 kW) each; 1 × Jeumont-Schneider EPM Magtronic electric 3,909 hp (2,915 kW); 1 × Shaft; Exide Hagen batteries
- Speed: 21 knots (39 km/h; 24 mph)
- Test depth: 400 m (1,300 ft)
- Complement: 32
- Sensors & processing systems: Naval Group SUBTICS combat management system; Thales TSM 2233 Eledone hull and flank array passive sonar; Thales Safare/S-Cube hull active sonar; Safran Series 20 target identification and classification system
- Electronic warfare & decoys: Thales DR 3000/ITT AR 900 electronic support measures; Naval Group Contralto-S decoy launchers; CANTO anti-torpedo countermeasures
- Armament: 6 × 533 mm (21 in) torpedo tubes: 8 × SM39 Exocet anti-ship missiles; 18 × F21 heavy-weight torpedoes; 30 × naval mines
- Notes: Sources:

Tonelero (S42) is the third unit of Riachuelo-class submarine built for the Brazilian Navy by ICN in Itaguaí, and DCNS.

The Brazilian boats are larger in length, tonnage and cargo capacity compared to the original French project. The Brazilian version are 70.62 m (231 ft 8 in) and 1,900 tons, compared to the original Scorpènes that are 61.7 m (202 ft 5 in) and 1,565 tons.

== Program history ==
In 2008, Brazil purchased four enlarged Scorpènes for USD 10 billion with a total technology transfer agreement and a second agreement to develop the first Brazilian nuclear-powered submarine, Álvaro Alberto. The hull of Riachuelo was laid down at Cherbourg, France on 27 May 2010 and it was jumboized at the Brazilian Navy Shipyard in Itaguaí in late 2012.

The first submarine Riachuelo was launched on 14 December 2018, and began sea trials in September 2019, the Humaitá was launched on 11 December 2020. Tonelero was launched on 27 March 2024 by Lady Rosângela Lula da Silva, wife of President Luiz Inácio Lula da Silva.

== Namesake ==
Tonelero is the second boat of the Brazilian Navy to receive this name, in honor of a military operation, which took place during the Platine War.

The other boat were:

- S Tonelero (S21) - Submarine of the Oberon class. (1971–2004)
