= Brazilian submarine Álvaro Alberto =

Brazilian nuclear submarine

Álvaro Alberto
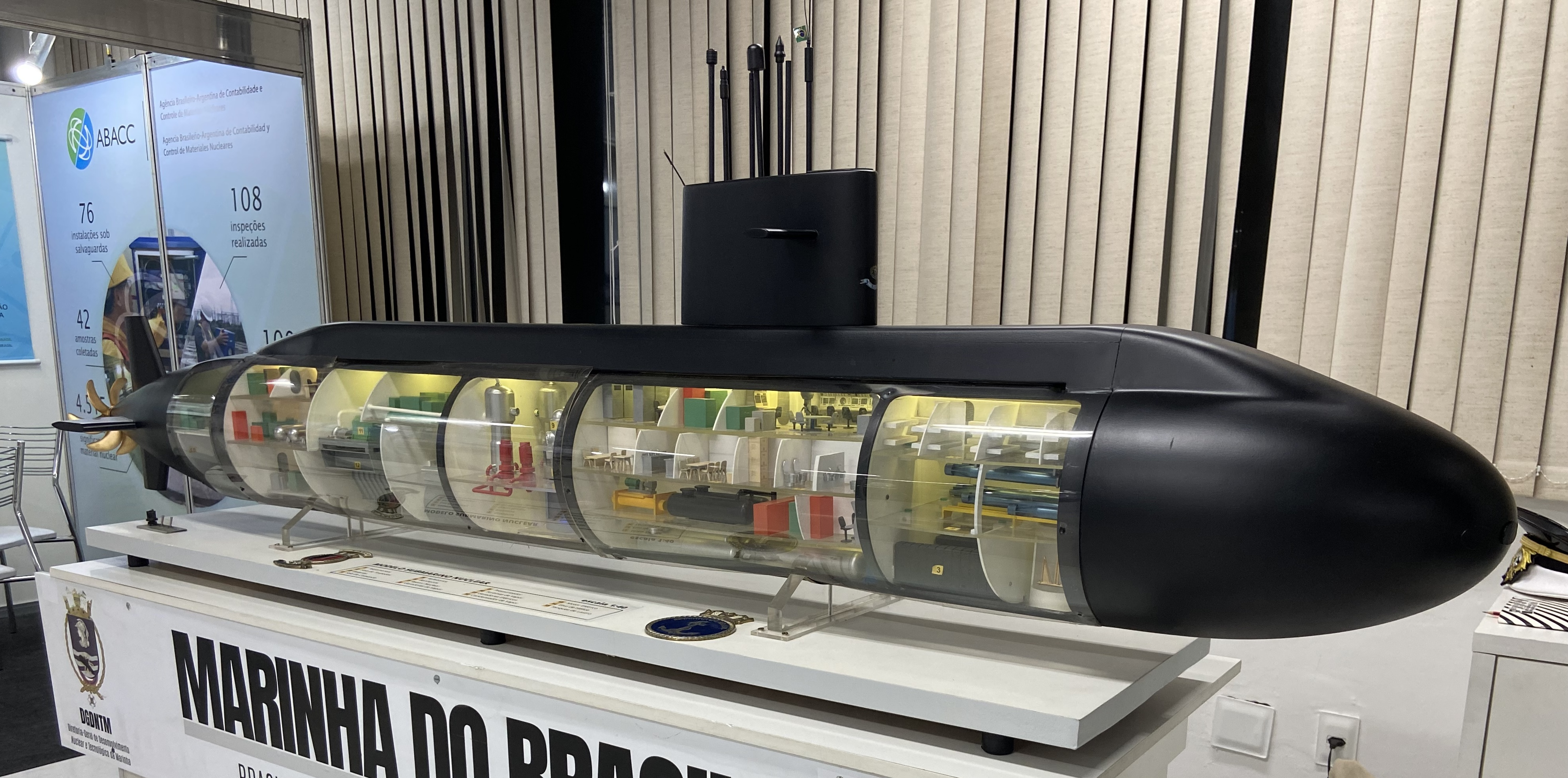
- Model of the submarine, 2024

History

Brazil
- Name: Álvaro Alberto
- Namesake: Álvaro Alberto da Motta e Silva
- Ordered: 23 December 2008
- Builder: ICN
- Cost: $4.1 billion (2024 budget report, at 2026 exchange rate)
- Launched: 2037 (expected)
- Home port: Madeira Island
- Identification: SN10
- Status: Under construction

General characteristics
- Type: Nuclear attack submarine
- Displacement: 6,000 t (5,900 long tons)
- Length: 100 m (330 ft)
- Beam: 9.8 m (32 ft)
- Propulsion: 1 × Pressurized water reactor, 48 MW (64,000 hp), LEU 20%; 1 × Nuclear turbo–electric engine; 1 × Shaft
- Speed: 25 knots (46 km/h; 29 mph)
- Range: Unlimited range, up to 25 years (nuclear fuel)
- Complement: 100
- Sensors & processing systems: Naval Group SUBTICS combat management system; Thales TSM 2233 Eledone hull and flank array passive sonar; Thales Safare/S-Cube hull active sonar; Safran Series 20 target identification and classification system
- Electronic warfare & decoys: Thales DR 3000/ITT AR 900 electronic support measures; Naval Group Contralto-S decoy launchers; CANTO anti-torpedo countermeasures
- Armament: 6 × 533 mm (21 in) torpedo tubes: 8 × SM39 Exocet anti-ship missiles; 18 × F21 heavy-weight torpedoes; 30 × naval mines
- Notes: Sources:

Álvaro Alberto, Brazil's first nuclear-powered submarine, is the fifth unit of the Riachuelo class based on the French Scorpène class and is part of a strategic partnership signed between France and Brazil on 23 December 2008 that created the Submarine Development Program. The submarine was named after the former Vice Admiral and scientist Álvaro Alberto da Motta e Silva, who was the responsible for the implementation of the country's nuclear program. He also served as President of the United Nations Atomic Energy Commission between 1946 and 1947, and as President of the Brazilian Academy of Sciences for two terms.

== Development ==
The beginning of the project for the domain of the nuclear fuel cycle and nuclear reactors took place in 1979 when, under the military regime with leadership of the Army General Ernesto Geisel and later General João Figueiredo, two enthusiasts of the nuclear technology, the government secretly joined the Institute of Energy and Nuclear Research of São Paulo where it started to work in the most ambitious military program to date. In 1982, the scientists won its first major victory after adopting the ultracentrifugation technique for enrichment and learning about the uranium hexafluoride technology in the city of Poços de Caldas, Minas Gerais. In the same year, the project researchers achieved isotopic uranium enrichment with centrifuges built entirely in Brazil. Over a period of approximately 20 years, the country acquired the full nuclear fuel cycle and was able to begin the construction of the naval nuclear reactor.

On 23 December 2008, Brazil purchased four Scorpène class conventionally-powered submarines from France in a deal of US$10 billion (equivalent to US$14 billion in 2024), with a total technology transfer agreement, giving to the country the knowledge for the design and construction of modern submarine hulls. The project was initiated in 2010 through the Submarine Development Program, with the Madeira Island base in Rio de Janeiro as the submarine development and manufacturing point. Between 2010 and 2012, a group of 31 engineers, 25 military officers and 6 civil employees, received theoretical training by the DCNS in Cherbourg. In 2018, more than 400 Brazilian engineers worked on the nuclear submarine project staff, originally formed by the group that received training in France. The first Brazilian Scorpène-class submarine, Riachuelo, was launched on 14 December 2018, the second unit, Humaitá, in 2020, the third unit Tonelero in 2024, and the fourth Almirante Karam on 26 November 2025.

In 2018, after many years and a series of problems, delays in federal funding and program freezes, the prototype of the naval nuclear reactor, known internally as the Brazilian Multipurpose Reactor was launched, by the state-owned nuclear company Nuclebrás. In 2020, the General Directorate of Nuclear and Technological Development of the Navy, authorized the production and testing of uranium dioxide pellets for zircaloy rods, essential for pressurized water reactors. The production of nuclear fuel for the Álvaro Alberto started in December 2021. On 6 June 2022, the Director General of the International Atomic Energy Agency, Rafael Grossi, stated that Brazil has initiated formal discussions with IAEA about Alvaro Alberto's nuclear fuel inspections by the international agency. The first steel cut of the hull qualification section of the boat was on 12 June 2024. The launch is expected for 2029 with more three or four years of sea trials until the commissioning between 2032 and 2034.

In September 2025, the Brazilian Navy and Naval Group of France signed additional contracts of €600 million, related to the nuclear reactor and technical support for the project. In March 2026, the Admiral Alexandre Rabello de Faria, chief of the General Directorate of Nuclear and Technological Development of the Navy (DGDNTM), announced that the keel laying has been rescheduled for 2027, with launch ceremony expected for 2037, due to budgetary issues, testing of the nuclear reactor prototype and negotiations with IAEA.

On 9 September 2026, ICN finished building the hull qualification section of the submarine, which replicates a portion of the hull and will be used for pressure testing and to validate of the manufacturing processes. As of July 2024, the Ministry of Defence's budget report for the program presented an spending plan of US$4.1 billion (R$22.6 billion) between 2009 and 2030 for the construction and development of the submarine, as well other US$1.2 billion (R$6.8 billion) for the project of the nuclear reactor. The official date of the beginning of the Álvaro Alberto's construction occurred on 20 October 2026 in Cherbourg, France, with the ceremony of the first steel cut of the resistant hull.

== Construction programme ==
No.	Name	Builder	First steel cut	Laid down	Launched	Comm.	Estimated cost
SN10	Álvaro Alberto	ICN, Itaguaí, Brazil	20 October 2026	2027 (expected)	2037 (expected)	TBD	$4.1 billion (2024 est.)

== Strategic rationale ==
In the Brazilian doctrine, the raison d'etre of the national defense strategy is to develop deterrence capability against a possible hostile force to the national territory. The country understands that with its future nuclear fleet, at least some of its weapons will be able to survive the first strike of an enemy and prevent further attempts at aggression. Another stated reason is to defend the resource-rich "Blue Amazon", the country's exclusive economic zone and continental shelf.

=== Nuclear policy ===
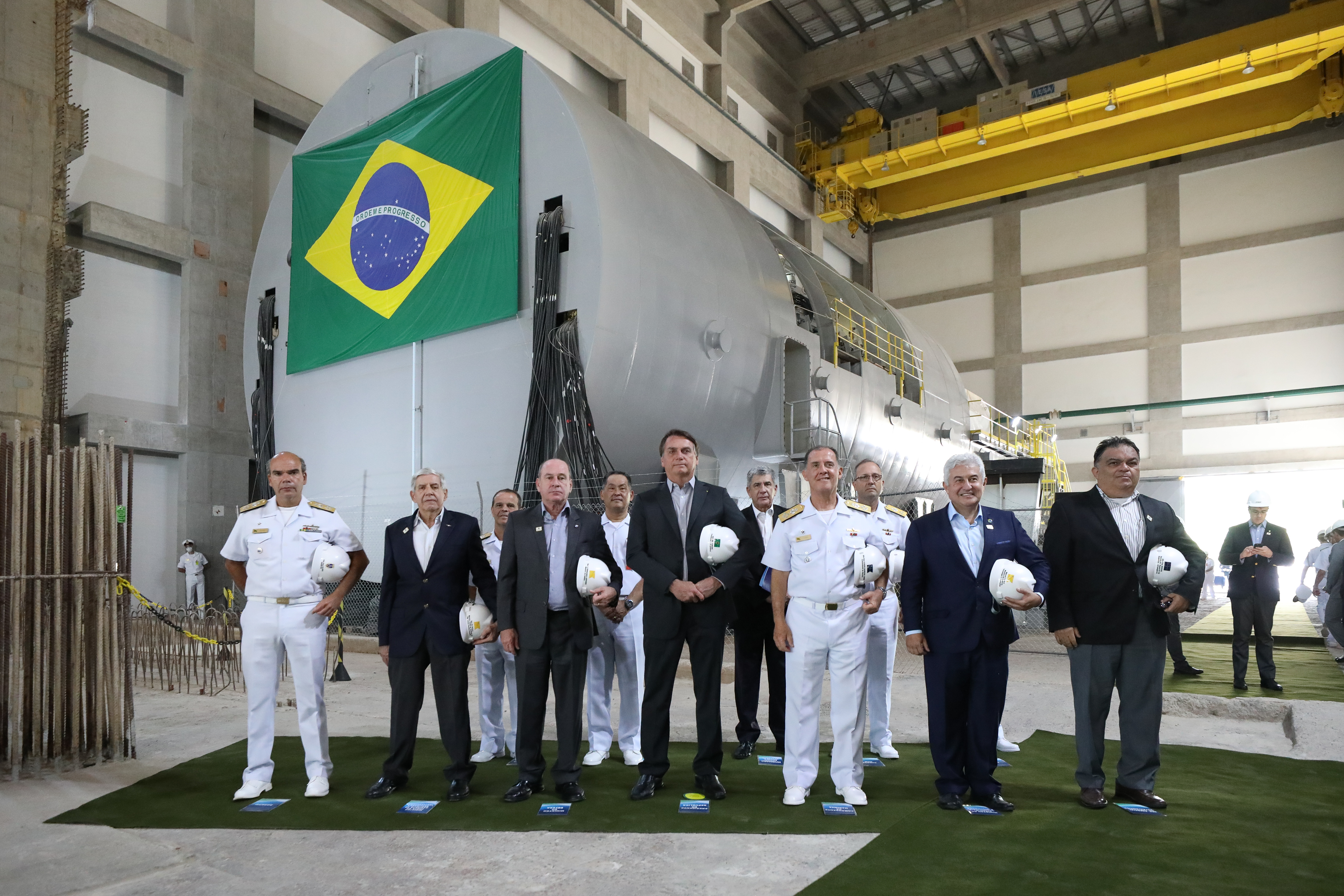
President Jair Bolsonaro with the prototype of the naval nuclear reactor

The country has a policy of no nuclear weapons since the 1990s. Nonetheless, experts at the Los Alamos National Laboratory have concluded that Brazil developed the technological capability to produce first generation nuclear warheads. If the country's current policy on this type of armament should change, Brazil would be able to produce highly enriched uranium using centrifuges like Resende for this type of armament. Instead, the country opted for working on the development of a nuclear submarine fleet. So far in the naval history, only the five permanent members of the U.N. Security Council: the United States, Russia, China, France and the United Kingdom, plus India – all nuclear-weapon states – have operated & developed nuclear submarines. In 2019, the Bulletin of the Atomic Scientists described Brazil as "the only non-nuclear weapon state on the verge of launching a nuclear-powered submarine". Australia, under the AUKUS programme, is pursuing a different arrangement to operate British-designed nuclear submarines powered by reactors supplied by the United States and the United Kingdom. Carlo Patti, author of Brazil in the Global Nuclear Order, told newspaper The Economist, that Brazil's nuclear pursuit placed the country "in the threshold between being a nuclear state and not being a nuclear state". That policy, say experts, turned Brazil independent in the nuclear technology's field and allowed to "keep its international reputation as a responsible power among institutions for nuclear nonproliferation".

=== International reactions ===
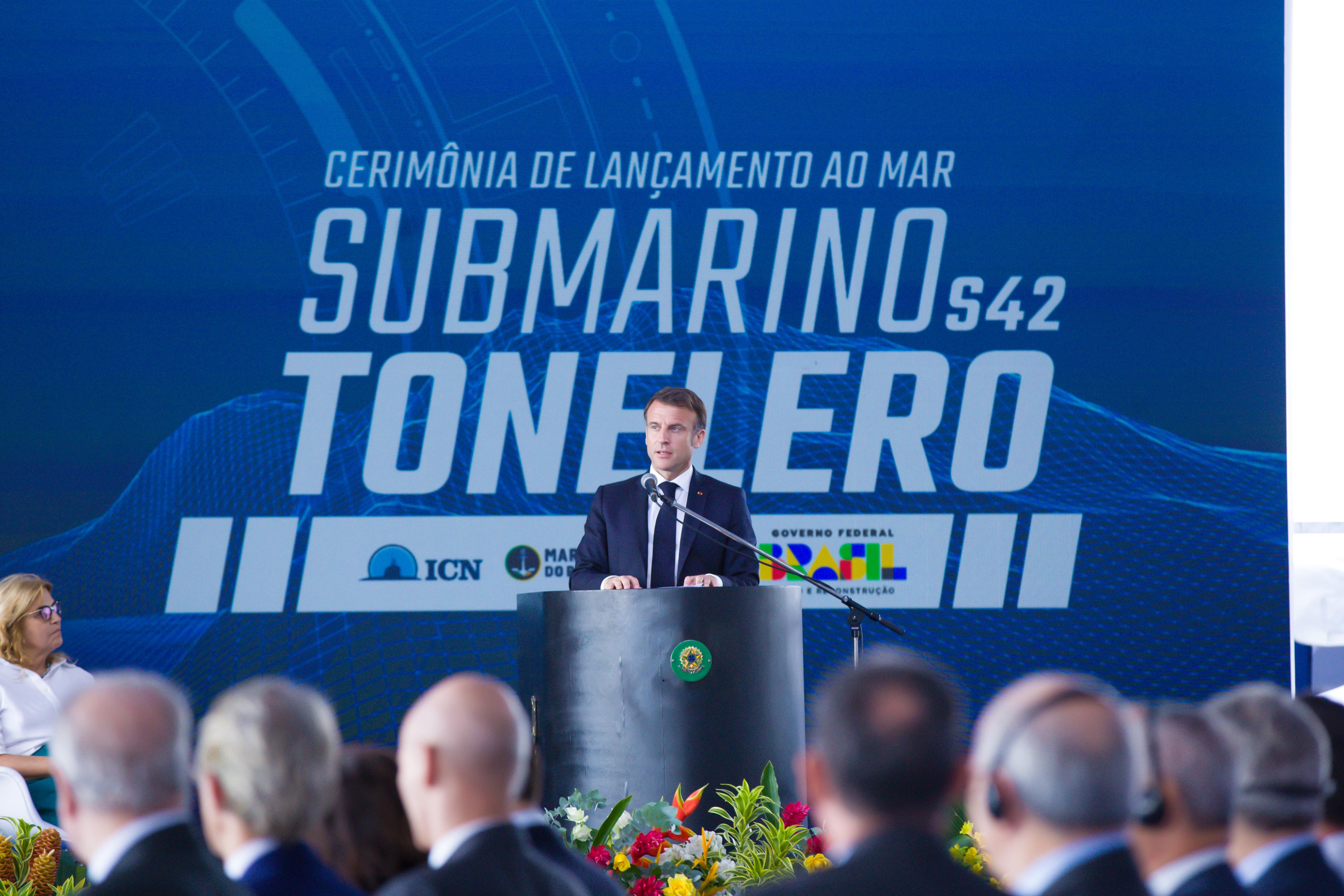
French President Emmanuel Macron praised the program

The program have sparked diverse international reactions regarding the purpose over the years, for example, for Hans Rühle, former Director of the Planning Staff of the German Ministry of Defense and NATO official, also former Chief of the Konrad Adenauer Foundation, "Brazil is almost certainly developing nuclear weapons, as the submarine program is clearly a cover for a nuclear bomb program" adding that "all Brazilian military officials basically agreed that the country needs a nuclear test at some point to proof their new capabilities".

For the Center for Security Studies of the Georgetown University in Washington D.C., "Brazil appears to be counting on its new submarine to fulfills a long-held ambition for great power status, challenging nonproliferation norms, without making tough foreign policy decisions or building a convincing military strategic case".

The French President Emmanuel Macron praised the program during the launch of the submarine Tonelero, one of the conventional units of the French-Brazilian partnership, and stated that the development shows that Brazil and France, "two international and peaceful great powers who reject being lackeys in a world divided between two blocks, must recognize that in this increasingly disorganized world, we must be able to speak of firmness and strength and know how to defend the international order with credibility" and that "only with peace we can built balance, but this requires us to be militarily stronger".

== Espionage allegations ==
In March 2022, The New York Times newspaper reported that US Navy employee Jonathan Toebbe and his wife Diana had approached the Brazilian embassy in Washington, with an offer to sell nuclear secrets about the Virginia-class submarine to Brazilian military to aid in the development of the country's nuclear submarine program. Brazilian authorities then informed the FBI, which conducted an investigation culminating in the Toebbe's arrest for espionage; they pleaded guilty. Neither the American nor the Brazilian government have confirmed or denied the report.

== See also ==
- Brazilian Navy Nuclear Program
