= Brazilian submarine Riachuelo (S40) =

Brazilian submarine

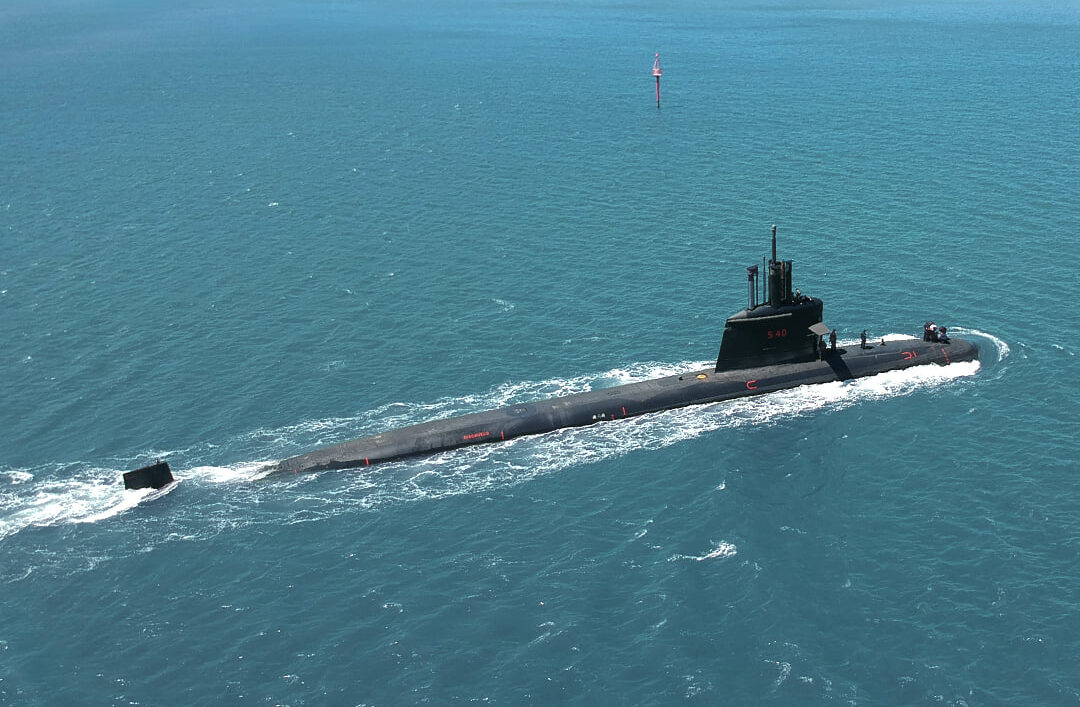
- Riachuelo

History

Brazil
- Name: Riachuelo
- Namesake: Battle of Riachuelo
- Ordered: 23 December 2008
- Builder: ICN, Madeira Island, Itaguaí
- Laid down: 27 May 2010
- Launched: 14 December 2018
- Sponsored by: Marcela Temer
- Commissioned: 1 September 2022
- Home port: Madeira Island
- Identification: MMSI number: 710462000; Callsign: PWRC; Pennant number: S40
- Status: Active

General characteristics
- Class & type: Riachuelo-class submarine
- Displacement: 1,900 t (1,900 long tons)
- Length: 70.62 m (231 ft 8 in)
- Beam: 6.2 m (20 ft 4 in)
- Draft: 5.8 m (19 ft 0 in)
- Propulsion: 4 × MTU 12V 396 SE84 diesels 1,500 hp (1,119 kW) each; 1 × Jeumont-Schneider EPM Magtronic electric 3,909 hp (2,915 kW); 1 × Shaft; Exide Hagen batteries
- Speed: 21 knots (39 km/h; 24 mph)
- Test depth: 400 m (1,300 ft)
- Complement: 32
- Sensors & processing systems: Naval Group SUBTICS combat management system; Thales TSM 2233 Eledone hull and flank array passive sonar; Thales Safare/S-Cube hull active sonar; Safran Series 20 target identification and classification system
- Electronic warfare & decoys: Thales DR 3000/ITT AR 900 electronic support measures; Naval Group Contralto-S decoy launchers; CANTO anti-torpedo countermeasures
- Armament: 6 × 533 mm (21 in) torpedo tubes: 8 × SM39 Exocet anti-ship missiles; 18 × F21 heavy-weight torpedoes; 30 × naval mines
- Notes: Sources:

Riachuelo (S40) is a Brazilian Riachuelo-class submarine built for the Brazilian Navy by DCNS in Cherbourg and ICN in Itaguaí, Brazil.

The Brazilian boats are larger in length, tonnage and cargo capacity compared to the French Scorpène class they are derived from. The Brazilian version are 70.62 m (231.7 ft) and 1,900 tons, compared to the original Scorpènes that are 61.7 m (202 ft) and 1,565 tons.

== Program history ==
In 2008, Brazil purchased four enlarged Scorpènes for USD 10 billion with a total technology transfer agreement and a second agreement to develop the first Brazilian nuclear-powered submarine, Álvaro Alberto. The hull of Riachuelo was laid down at Cherbourg, France, on 27 May 2010 and it was jumboized at the Brazilian Navy Shipyard in Itaguaí in late 2012.

Riachuelo was launched on 14 December 2018 by Lady Marcela Temer, wife of President Michel Temer, and began sea trials in September 2019, the Humaitá was launched on 11 December 2020.

== Development and design ==
The first stage of construction of the submarine took place in France, at the headquarters of DCNS in Cherbourg, with the cutting of the first steel plates of the structure. At this point, technology transfer from French technicians to Brazilians began. In the middle of 2013, internal parts manufactured in France arrived, which were then integrated to the other parts built in Brazil. In September 2015, the first construction stage was completed, with the delivery of the last section of resistant hull.

The initial Navy predictions for the delivery of Riachuelo were for 2015, however, after some postponements, the boat was launched in 2018, in order to start the platform acceptance testing phase, with two years in duration, plus six months of tests of the combat systems, with its incorporation to the operative sector foreseen for the middle of 2021. The commissioning of Riachuelo took place on 1 September 2022.

The other boats of the S-BR class are Humaitá (S41), Tonelero (S42) and Almirante Karam (S43).

== Namesake ==
The Riachuelo is the seventh boat of the Brazilian Navy to receive this name, in honor of the Battle of Riachuelo, which took place in 1865, in the Paraguayan War.

The others were:

- Riachuelo - Yacht.
- Riachuelo - Steamboat, later renamed Marquês de Caxias.
- Riachuelo - Flat-bottomed boat.
- Riachuelo - Steam battleship of the Imperial Brazilian Navy (1883–1910)
- Riachuelo (S15) - Submarine of the Gato class, used in World War II by the U.S. Navy, before being incorporated into the Brazilian Navy (1943–1968)
- Riachuelo (S22) - Submarine of the Oberon class, currently serving as a museum (1977–1997)
