= Brazilian submarine Humaitá (S41) =

Brazilian submarine

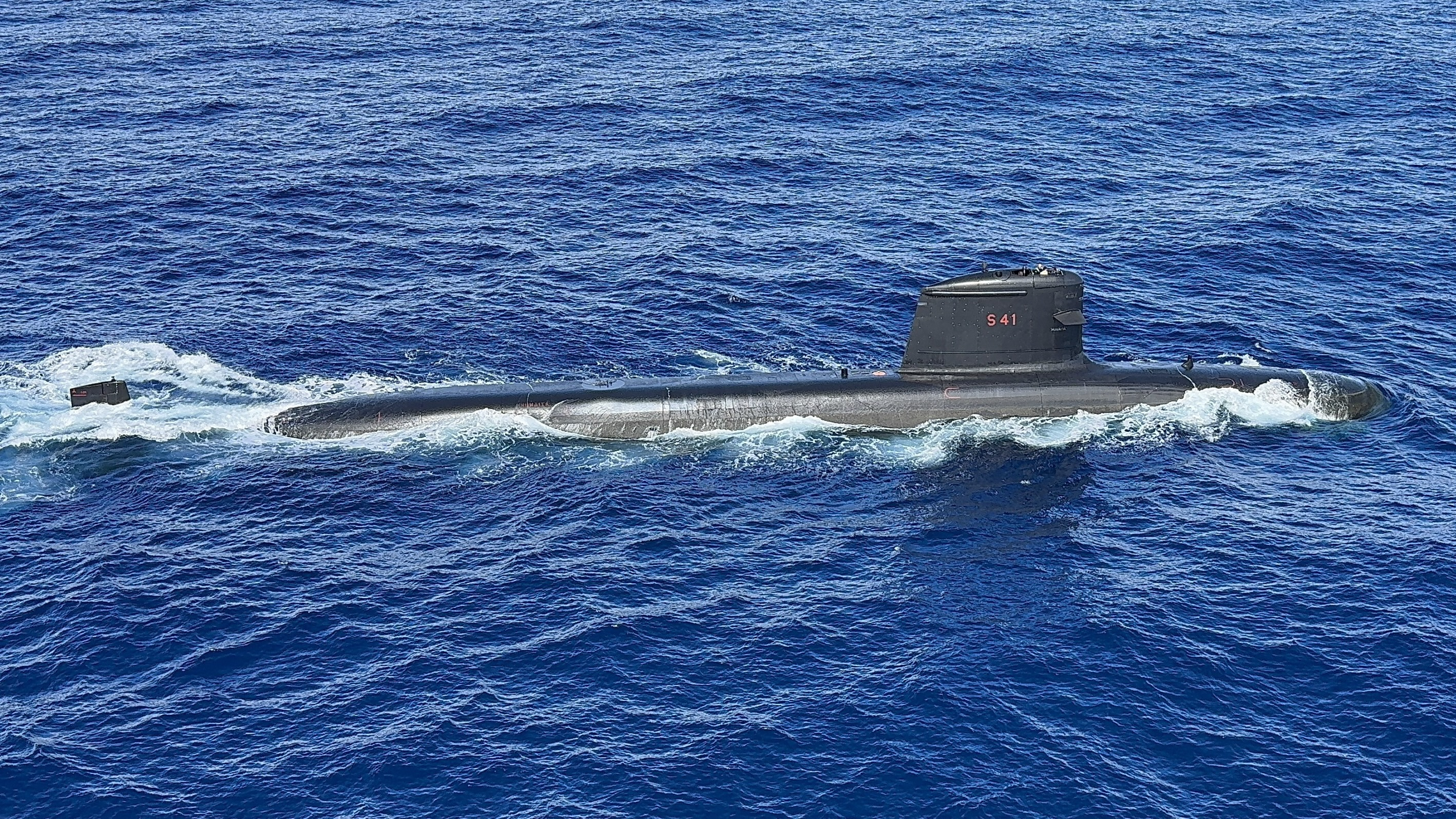
- Humaitá

History

Brazil
- Name: Humaitá
- Namesake: Passage of Humaitá
- Ordered: 23 December 2008
- Builder: ICN, Madeira Island, Itaguaí
- Laid down: 9 September 2013
- Launched: 11 December 2020
- Sponsored by: Adelaide Chaves Azevedo e Silva
- Commissioned: 12 January 2024
- Home port: Madeira Island
- Identification: MMSI number: 710500000; Callsign: PWHU; Pennant number: S41
- Status: Active

General characteristics
- Class & type: Riachuelo-class submarine
- Displacement: 1,900 t (1,900 long tons)
- Length: 70.62 m (231 ft 8 in)
- Beam: 6.2 m (20 ft 4 in)
- Draft: 5.8 m (19 ft 0 in)
- Propulsion: 4 × MTU 12V 396 SE84 diesels 1,500 hp (1,119 kW) each; 1 × Jeumont-Schneider EPM Magtronic electric 3,909 hp (2,915 kW); 1 × Shaft; Exide Hagen batteries
- Speed: 21 knots (39 km/h; 24 mph)
- Test depth: 400 m (1,300 ft)
- Complement: 32
- Sensors & processing systems: Naval Group SUBTICS combat management system; Thales TSM 2233 Eledone hull and flank array passive sonar; Thales Safare/S-Cube hull active sonar; Safran Series 20 target identification and classification system
- Electronic warfare & decoys: Thales DR 3000/ITT AR 900 electronic support measures; Naval Group Contralto-S decoy launchers; CANTO anti-torpedo countermeasures
- Armament: 6 × 533 mm (21 in) torpedo tubes: 8 × SM39 Exocet anti-ship missiles; 18 × F21 heavy-weight torpedoes; 30 × naval mines
- Notes: Sources:

Humaitá (S41) is a Brazilian Riachuelo-class submarine built for the Brazilian Navy by ICN in Itaguaí, and DCNS.

The Brazilian boats are larger in length, tonnage and cargo capacity compared to the original French project. The Brazilian version are 70.62 m (231 ft 8 in) and 1,900 tons, compared to the original Scorpènes that are 61.7 m (202 ft 5 in) and 1,565 tons.

== Program history ==
In 2008, Brazil purchased four enlarged Scorpènes for USD 10 billion with a total technology transfer agreement and a second agreement to develop the first Brazilian nuclear-powered submarine, Álvaro Alberto. The hull of Riachuelo was laid down at Cherbourg, France on 27 May 2010 and it was jumboized at the Brazilian Navy Shipyard in Itaguaí in late 2012.

The first submarine Riachuelo was launched on 14 December 2018, and began sea trials in September 2019, the Humaitá was launched on 11 December 2020 by Lady Adelaide Chaves Azevedo e Silva, wife of Defense Minister Fernando Azevedo e Silva.

== Development and design ==
The first stage of construction of the Humaitá took place in September 2013 in Brazil, at the headquarters of ICN in Itaguaí, with the cutting of the first steel plates of the structure. At this point, technology transfer from French technicians to Brazilians had already started.

The other boats of the Brazilian class are Riachuelo (S40), Tonelero (S42) and Almirante Karam (S43).

== Namesake ==
Humaitá is the fifth boat and the third submarine of the Brazilian Navy to receive this name, in honor of a military operation, which took place in 1868, in the Paraguayan War.

The other submarines were:

- S Humaitá (S14) - Submarine of the Gato class, used in World War II by the U.S. Navy, before being incorporated into the Brazilian Navy. (1957–1967)
- S Humaitá (S20) - Submarine of the Oberon class. (1973–1993)
