= Riachuelo-class submarine =

Brazilian class of submarines

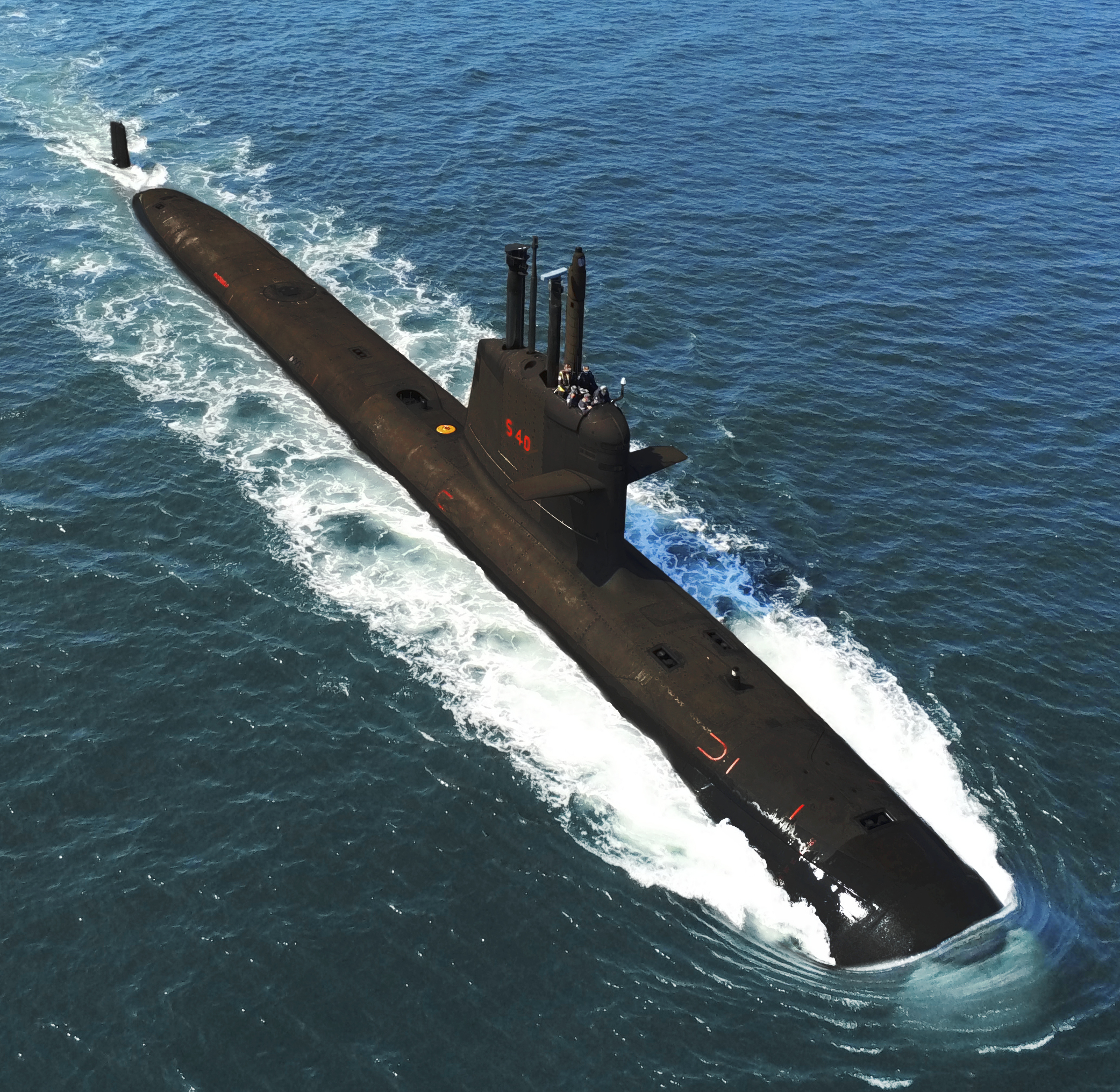
- Riachuelo

Class overview
- Name: Riachuelo class
- Builders: ICN
- Operators: Brazilian Navy
- Preceded by: Tupi class
- Subclasses: Álvaro Alberto
- Cost: US$1 billion per boat (diesel-electric); US$4.1 billion (nuclear, 2024 budget report est.)
- Built: 2010–present
- In commission: 2022–present
- Planned: 5 (4 SSK, 1 SSN)
- Building: 1
- Completed: 4
- Active: 3

General characteristics
- Type: Attack submarine
- Displacement: Diesel-electric: 1,900 t (1,900 long tons); Nuclear: 6,000 t (5,900 long tons)
- Length: Diesel-electric: 70.62 m (231 ft 8 in); Nuclear: 100 m (328 ft 1 in)
- Beam: Diesel-electric: 6.2 m (20 ft 4 in); Nuclear: 9.8 m (32 ft 2 in)
- Propulsion: Diesel-electric: 4 × MTU 12V 396 SE84 diesels 1,500 hp (1,119 kW) each; 1 × Jeumont-Schneider EPM Magtronic electric 3,909 hp (2,915 kW); 1 × Shaft; Exide Hagen batteries; Nuclear: 1 × Pressurized water reactor, 48 MW (64,000 hp), LEU 20%; 1 × Nuclear turbo-electric engine; 1 × Shaft
- Speed: Diesel-electric: 21 knots (39 km/h; 24 mph); Nuclear: 25 knots (46 km/h; 29 mph)
- Test depth: 400 m (1,300 ft)
- Complement: Diesel-electric: 32; Nuclear: 100
- Sensors & processing systems: Naval Group SUBTICS combat management system; Thales TSM 2233 Eledone hull and flank array passive sonar; Thales Safare/S-Cube hull active sonar; Safran Series 20 target identification and classification system
- Electronic warfare & decoys: Thales DR 3000/ITT AR 900 electronic support measures; Naval Group Contralto-S decoy launchers; CANTO anti-torpedo countermeasures
- Armament: 6 × 533 mm (21 in) torpedo tubes: 8 × SM39 Exocet anti-ship missiles; 18 × F21 heavy-weight torpedoes; 30 × naval mines
- Notes: Sources:

The Riachuelo class are a Brazilian class of diesel-electric and nuclear-powered attack submarines developed by the state-owned shipyard Itaguaí Construções Navais (ICN), based on the French Scorpène class as part of the Submarine Development Program.

== History ==
In 2008, the Presidents of Brazil and France, Luiz Inácio Lula da Silva and Nicolas Sarkozy, signed a strategic partnership to the construction of four conventionally-powered submarines, and the support for the development of the first Brazilian nuclear submarine, in a program called PROSUB.

The project was initiated in 2010 with the Madeira Island base in Rio de Janeiro as the submarine development and manufacturing point. Between 2010 and 2012, a group of 31 engineers, 25 officers and 6 civil employees, received theoretical training by the DCNS in Cherbourg, France. In 2018, more than 400 Brazilian engineers worked only on the nuclear submarine project staff, originally formed by the group that received training in France.

The first stage of construction of the conventionally-powered Riachuelo took place in France, with the cutting of the first steel plates of the structure. At this point, technology transfer from French technicians to Brazilians began.

The conventional Brazilian boats are larger in length, tonnage and cargo capacity compared to the French Scorpène class they are derived from. The Brazilian version are 70.62 m (231 ft 8 in) and 1,900 tons, compared to the original Scorpènes that are 61.7 m (202 ft 5 in) and 1,565 tons.

== Nuclear submarine ==
As part of the program, a fifth submarine, named Álvaro Alberto, will be powered by nuclear propulsion. This unit has many similarities to its diesel powered predecessors of the Riachuelo class. The first Brazilian nuclear submarine will have a beam of 9.8 m (32 ft 2 in) to accommodate the pressurized water nuclear reactor (PWR).

Its 100 m (330 ft) length and 6,000-ton displacement will be propelled by a 48 MW (64,000 hp) fully-electric propulsion system. Once the vessel is completed no fuel imports are needed as all fuel required for the life cycle is included in the reactor.

== Boats ==
The names of the conventional boats were selected to represent key Imperial Brazilian Navy's military operations during the Paraguayan War and the Platine War, and former Admiral Alfredo Karam. The nuclear boat honors the former Vice Admiral and scientist Álvaro Alberto da Motta e Silva.

No.	Name	Launched	Comm.	Status
S40	Riachuelo	14 Dec 2018	1 Sep 2022	Active
S41	Humaitá	11 Dec 2020	12 Jan 2024	Active
S42	Tonelero	27 Mar 2024	26 Nov 2025	Active
S43	Almirante Karam	26 Nov 2025	2026	Sea trials
SN10 (Note: SSN unit)	Álvaro Alberto	2037		Under construction

== Operational history ==
In May 2026, the submarine Humaitá exercised with the US Navy's aircraft carrier USS Nimitz (CVN-68) and destroyer USS Gridley (DDG-101) near the coast of Rio de Janeiro as part of the Southern Seas 2026 joint exercises.

In August 2026, the submarine Humaitá exercised with Argentine frigate La Argentina (D-11) and corvettes Espora (P-41) and Rosales (P-42) during the Fraterno XXXIX annual exercise with the Argentine Navy. The other Brazilian means included the frigate Tamandaré (F200).

== See also ==
- History of submarines
- Brazilian Submarine Force Command
- Tamandaré-class frigates
