= Itaguaí Construções Navais =

Brazilian naval builder

Itaguaí Construções Navais S.A. — ICN
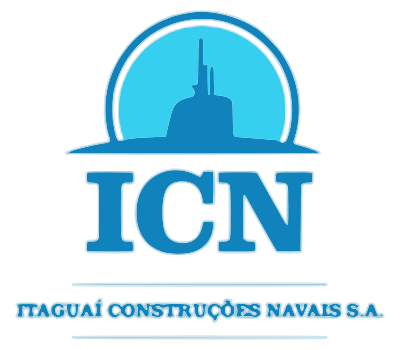

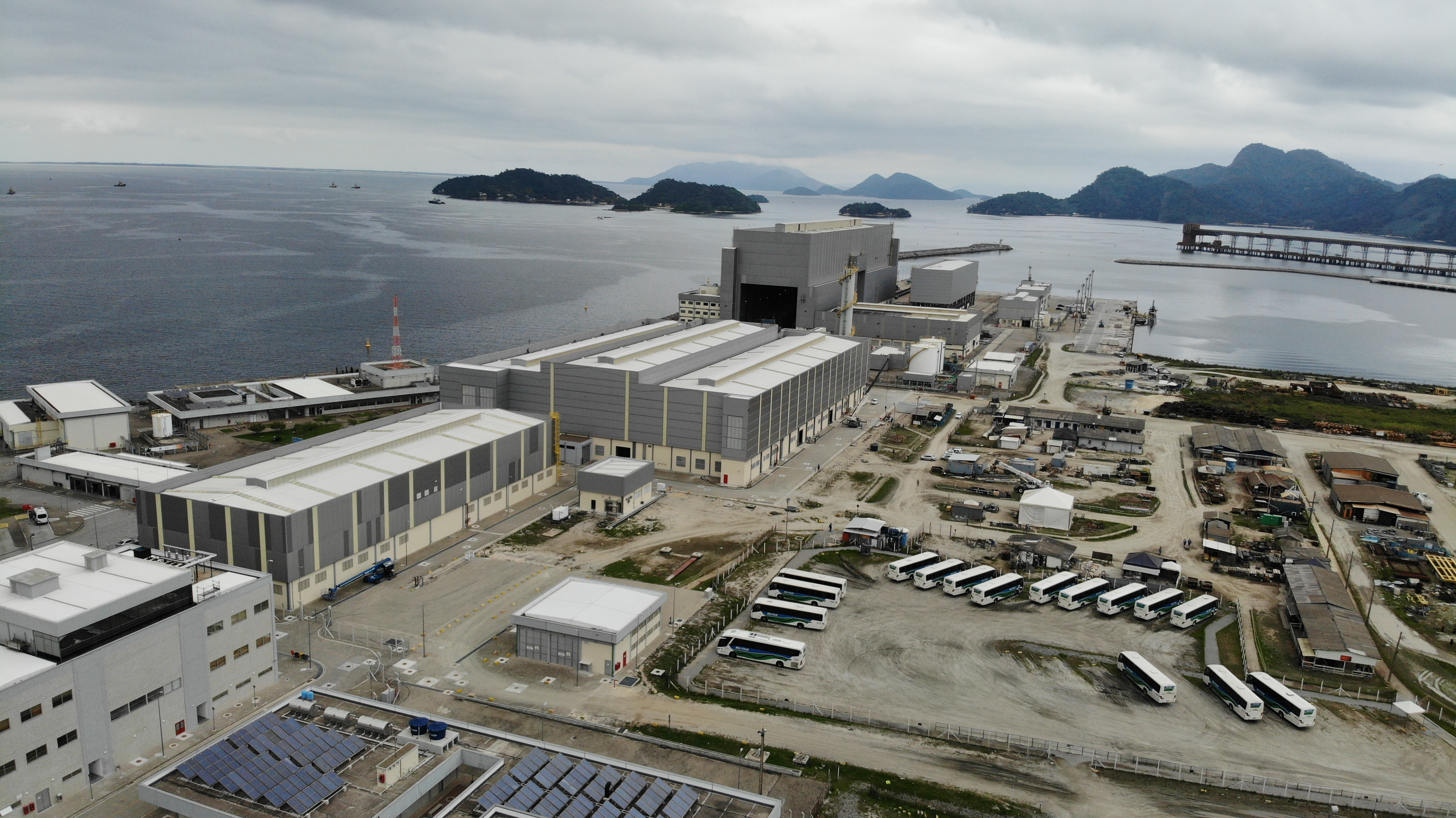
- Headquarters at the Madeira Island, Itaguaí, Rio de Janeiro
- Type: Sociedade Anônima
- Industry: Defence, Shipbuilding, Engineering
- Founded: 21 August 2009; 17 years ago
- Founder: Brazilian Government
- Headquarters: Madeira Island, Itaguaí, Rio de Janeiro, Brazil
- Key people: Renaud Poyet (CEO)
- Products: Warships, Nuclear engineering
- Owner: Brazilian Government
- Number of employees: 2,000 (2019)
- Website: http://www.icnavais.com

The Itaguaí Construções Navais S.A. known as ICN, is a Brazilian state-owned defence company specialized in naval-based platforms and naval nuclear engineering, founded on 21 August 2009. The company employs nearly 2,000 people.

== History ==
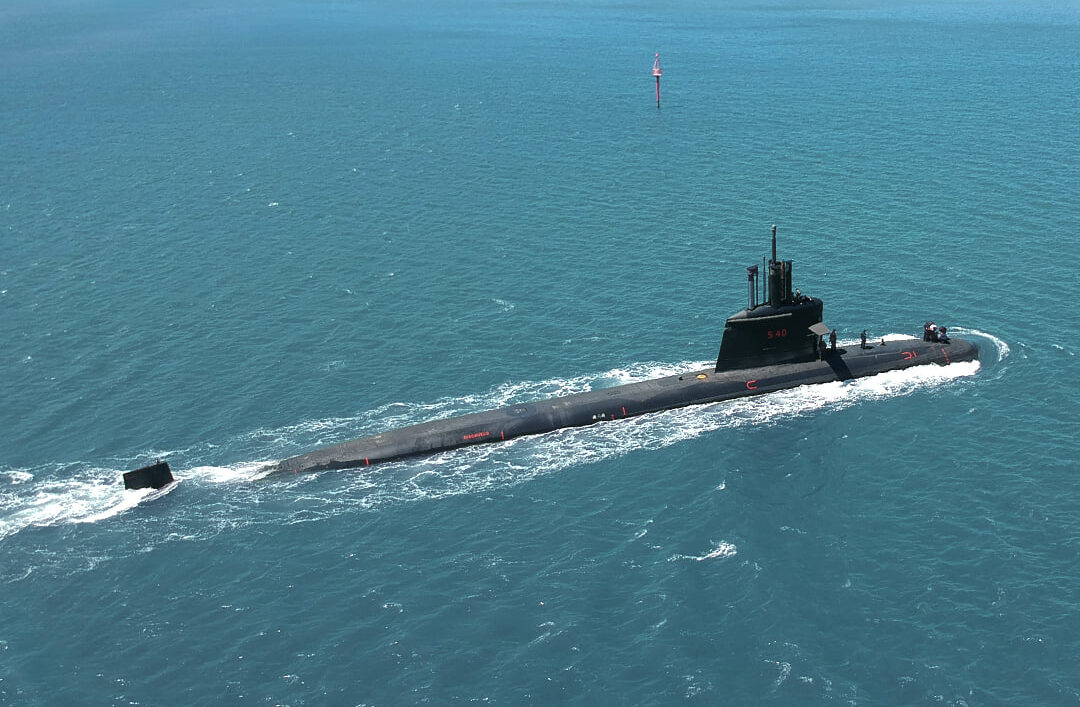
Submarine Riachuelo

The company was created in 2009 to lead the development of projects for the naval modernization plan of the Brazilian Armed Forces, mainly of the Submarine Development Program (PROSUB), after Brazil and France signed cooperation agreements for the construction of the new conventional submarines for the Brazilian Navy, including technical assistance for the development of the hull of the first Brazilian nuclear submarine, Álvaro Alberto, to be launched in 2029-30.

=== Idealization of the company ===
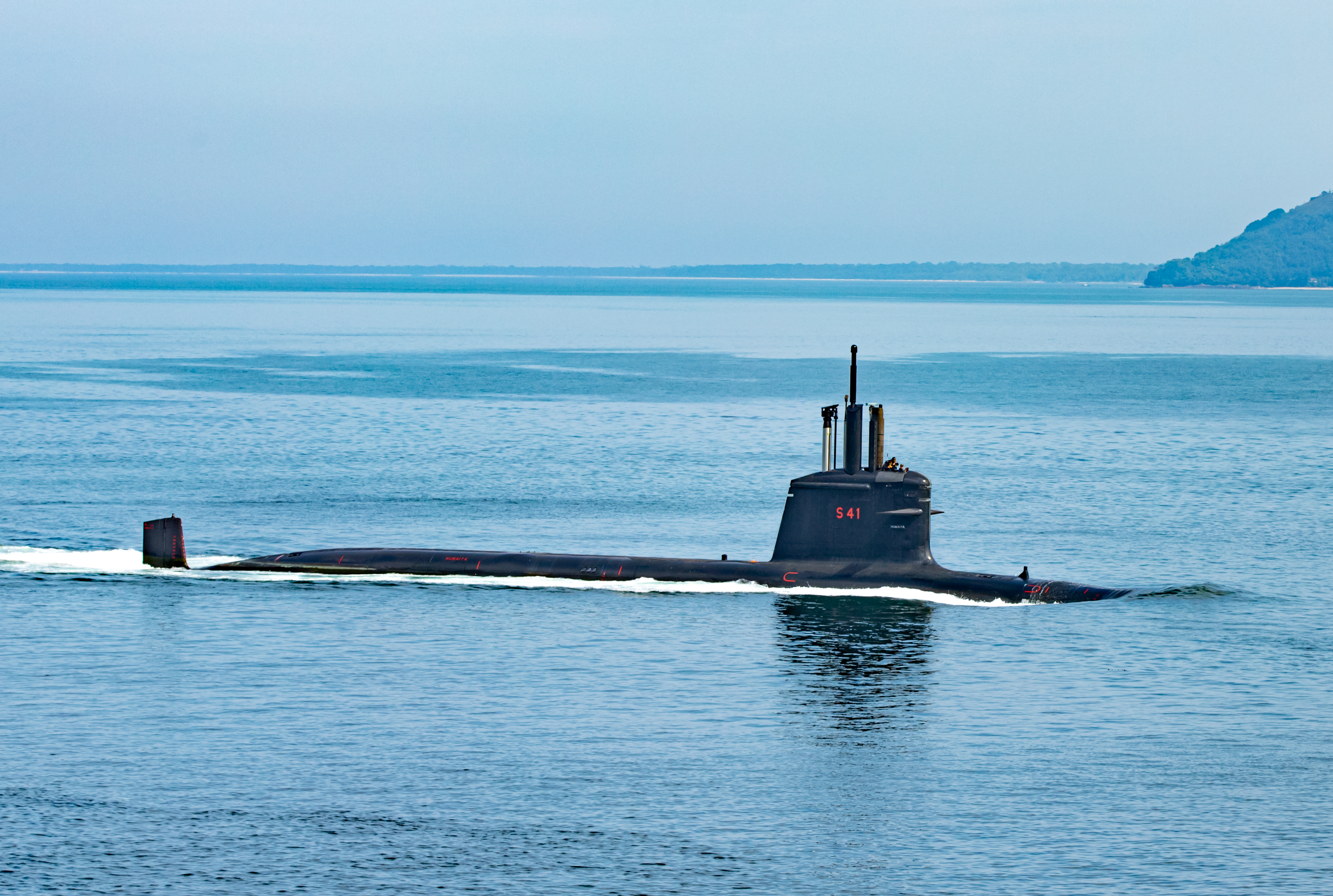
Submarine Humaitá

The company was created in 2009, when the Presidents of Brazil and France, Luiz Inácio Lula da Silva and Nicolas Sarkozy, signed the cooperation agreements. ICN would be responsible for receiving the technology of the French diesel-electric submarines from DCNS (now Naval Group), and for the construction of four submarines of the class in Brazilian territory, in the future Madeira Island Submarine Base, in an agreement of US$ 10 billion.

=== Start of operations ===
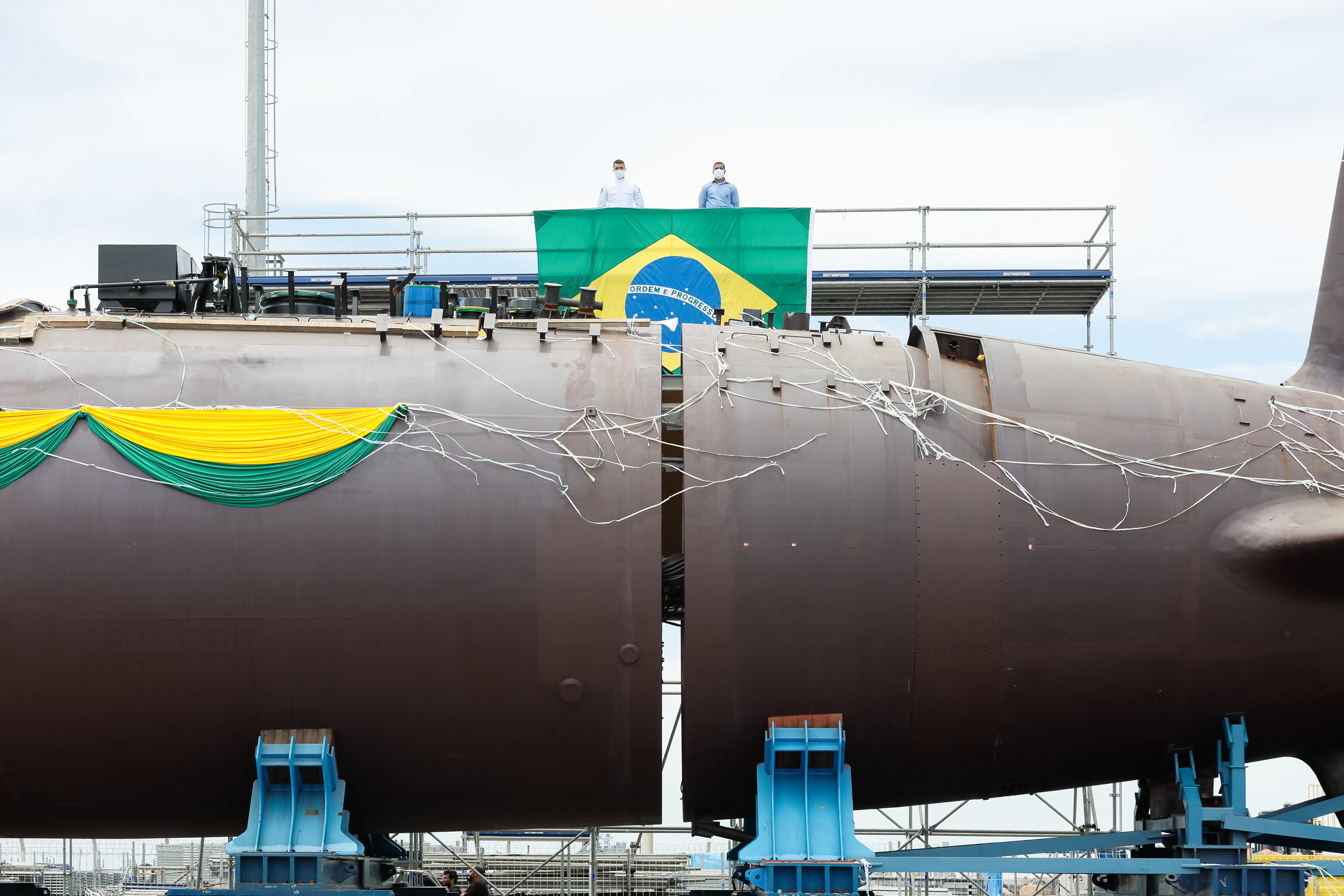
Hull integration ceremony of submarine Tonelero

The operations started in 2009, when the first group of 31 engineers, 25 officers and 6 civil employees, received theoretical training and the technology in France. In the same year, Brazil and France began the construction of the first of the four Brazilian Scorpène-class submarines, the Riachuelo, at the Naval Group headquarters in Cherbourg. The first parts were transferred to Brazil in 2012, for integration with the parts built by the ICN in Itaguaí, Rio de Janeiro. The development and construction were entirely in the hands of Brazilians in 2013, with the construction of the second submarine, the Humaitá, starting in the same year.

=== New base and the nuclear submarine ===
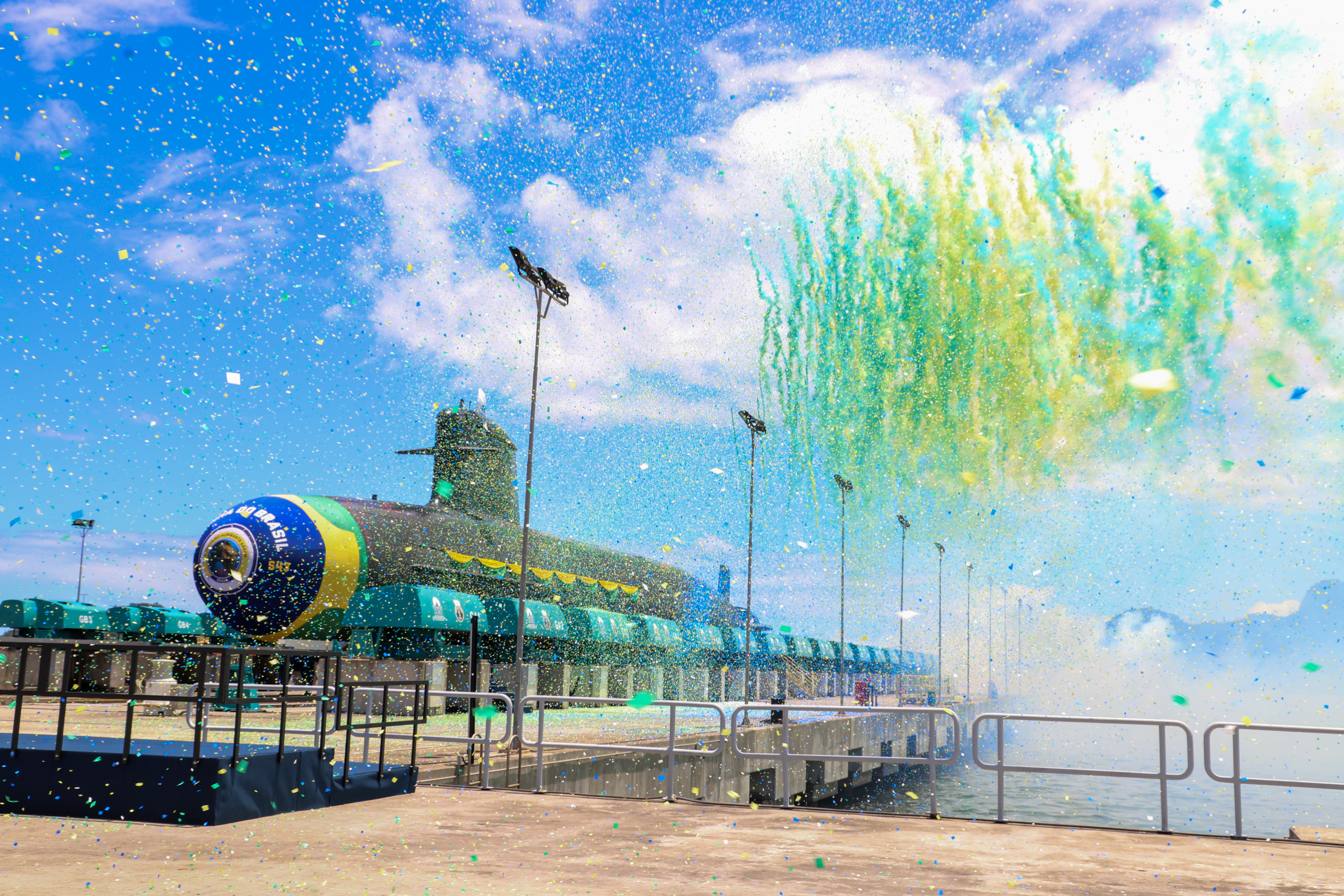
Launch ceremony of submarine Almirante Karam

The construction of the submarines Tonelero and Angostura started in 2017 and 2018 respectively. In 2020, ICN and the Brazilian Navy inaugurated the Madeira Island Submarine Base, with the objective of continue the construction of the Scorpénes, as well the construction of the Brazilian nuclear submarine fleet, starting with the Álvaro Alberto. The facility is also the base for other Navy boats, such as the Type 209 submarines, for modernization and inspections.

== Activities ==
The company is the only in the Southern Hemisphere and Latin America able to design, build and maintain diesel-electric and nuclear submarines.

=== Submarines and underwater weapons ===
- Conventional submarines: Riachuelo-class submarine
- Nuclear attack submarines: Álvaro Alberto-class

=== Proposed projects ===
- Antarctic support ship: competing project for the new research icebreaker of the Brazilian Antarctic Program

== Organization ==
The company is controlled by the Brazilian government through the state-owned company Naval Projects Management Company (EMGEPRON) with 59% stake, the Naval Group from France holds 41% stake.

=== Governance ===
- Chairman and CEO: Renaud Poyet
- Executive Vice President, Industrial: Mário Botelho
- Executive Vice President, Governance: Daniel Sá
- Executive Vice President, Operations: Pierre Dubranna

== See also ==
- Ship-building
- Navantia
- Fincantieri
- Submarine Development Program
