= Nuclebrás Equipamentos Pesados =

Brazilian nuclear company

Nuclebrás Equipamentos Pesados S.A. — NUCLEP
- Company type: Sociedade Anônima
- Industry: Heavy equipment for nuclear, defense, oil and gas industries
- Founded: 12 April 1975; 51 years ago
- Founder: Brazilian Government
- Headquarters: Itaguaí, Rio de Janeiro, Brazil
- Key people: Carlos Henrique Silva Seixas (CEO)
- Products: Nuclear engineering
- Owner: Brazilian Government
- Website: https://www.nuclep.gov.br/en

The Nuclebrás Equipamentos Pesados S.A., commonly shortened to NUCLEP, is a Brazilian state-owned nuclear company specialized in nuclear engineering and heavy equipment for nuclear, defense, oil and gas industries, founded on 12 April 1975.

== See also ==
- Goiânia accident (Nuclebrás aided in response effort)
- National Nuclear Energy Commission
