= Madeira Island Submarine Base =

Submarine base of the Brazilian Navy

- Base de Submarinos da Ilha da Madeira
- Itaguaí, Rio de Janeiro in Brazil
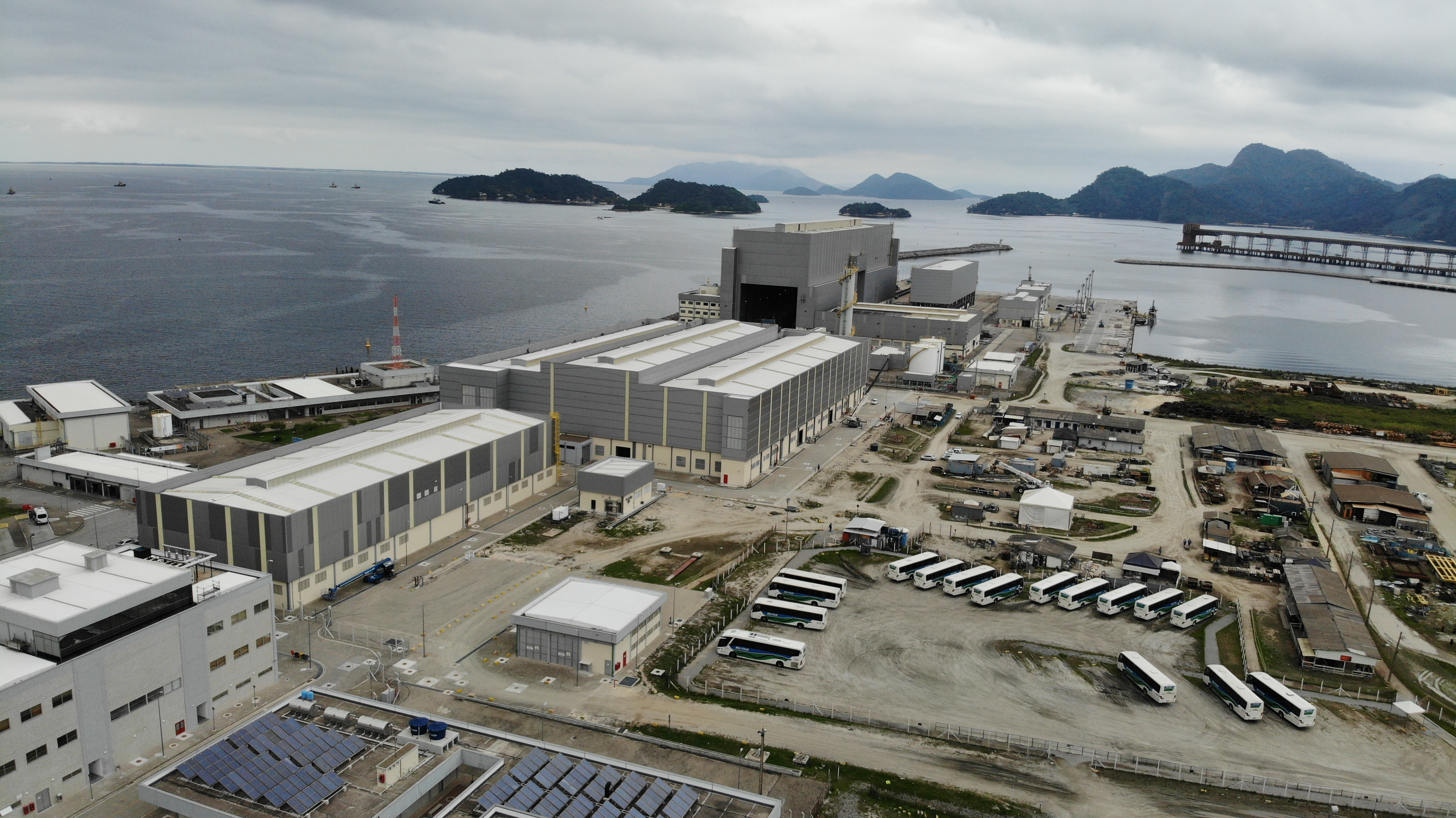

Site information
- Type: Navy base
- Controlled by: Brazilian Navy
- Open to the public: No

Location
- Location in Brazil
- Coordinates: 22°55′50.3″S 43°50′56.7″W

Site history
- In use: 2020–present

Garrison information
- Occupants: Brazilian Submarine Force Command

Madeira Island Submarine Base, commonly shortened BSIM is a submarine base of the Brazilian Navy, located in Itaguaí, Brazil.

== History ==
The BSIM was conceived in order to receive the construction of the new submarines of the Navy and to serve as the headquarters of the company Itaguaí Construções Navais.

The first Brazilian Scorpène class submarine Riachuelo (S40), was launched on 14 December 2018, with the Humaitá (S41) on 11 December 2020. The construction of the submarines Tonelero (S42) and Almirante Karam (S43) started in 2017 and 2018 respectively. Since 2018, the base is home of the construction of the Brazilian nuclear submarine Álvaro Alberto. On 12 July 2021, the Navy transferred the Brazilian Submarine Force Command (ComForS) to the site.

== See also ==
- List of Brazilian military bases
- Submarine Development Program
