= F21 (torpedo) =

F21 torpedo
- Type: Heavyweight dual-purpose ASW and ASuW torpedo
- Place of origin: France; Germany

Service history
- In service: 2018-present
- Used by: See operators

Production history
- Manufacturer: Naval Group; Thales; Atlas Elektronik

Specifications
- Mass: 1,550 kg (3,420 lb)
- Length: 6.0 m (19.7 ft)
- Diameter: 533 mm (21.0 in)
- Effective firing range: 50 km (31 mi; 27 nmi)
- Warhead weight: 200 kg (440 lb)
- Detonation mechanism: Proximity fuze
- Engine: Electric
- Operational range: 57 km (31 nmi)
- Maximum depth: 10 to 600 m (33 to 1,969 ft)
- Maximum speed: 93 km/h (50 kn; 58 mph)
- Guidance system: Wire-guided, acoustic homing
- Launch platform: Submarine

The F21 is a heavy-weight torpedo developed by Naval Group for the French Navy to replace the F17 torpedo.

It is designed to neutralize enemy ships and submarines and capable of operating in deep waters and near coastal areas with high levels of noise and dense shipping.

It is planned to gradually equip all French submarines, starting in 2018. The contract includes the development and delivery of about one hundred F21 torpedoes and their integration into French submarines. Naval Group delivered a batch of six torpedoes to the French Navy in November 2019. It has also been selected for the Brazilian Navy with the first batch handed over in January 2020. On 16 June 2026 the Dutch Ministry of Defence and Naval Group signed a contract for the supply of F21 Mk2 heavyweight torpedoes to equip the future Orka-class submarines of the Royal Netherlands Navy (RNLN). As a result of this contract, the RNLN will become the first SSK fleet within NATO to operate the F21 torpedo.

== History ==
=== Concept ===
The F21 was to be a development version of the Italian Black Shark torpedo. In 2008 France signed a development contract for 93 heavy torpedoes for its nuclear submarines, to be delivered from 2015. The original plan called for a derivative of the Black Shark to be built by a joint venture between DCNS, Thales and WASS, but they fell out and DCNS will now be developing the F21 Artemis with Thales and Atlas Electronic. The F21 shares similarities with the Black Shark, including an electric motor driven by an aluminium silver-oxide (AgO-Al) battery. and a contra-rotating propeller It has a warhead of PBX B2211, range of 50 km (31 mi) and speed of 50 knots (93 km/h). As of 2012 the project has a €485m budget with a unit cost of €2.3m (FY12), or €5.2m including development costs.

=== Qualification ===
The F21 was first tested on DCNS's Pégase catamaran in February 2013 and a submarine launch was planned for 2014, with production deliveries scheduled to start in late 2015. Qualification testing began in 2016, and were completed in June 2017 off the coast of Var.

== Operators ==
=== Current operators ===
France
The torpedoes are used with:
- Ballistic missile submarines:
  - Triomphant-class submarine
  - SNLE 3G-class submarine (future)
- Nuclear attack submarine:
  - Suffren-class submarine
  - Rubis-class submarine
Brazil
The torpedoes are used with:
- Conventional Riachuelo-class submarine (Brazilian variant of the Scorpène-class submarine)
- Nuclear Riachuelo-class submarine (Brazilian variant of the Scorpène-class submarine)

=== Future operators ===
Netherlands
The F21 Mk2 torpedoes will be used with:
- Orka-class submarine

== See also ==
- American 21 inch torpedo
- Baek Sang Eo (White Shark)
- Black Shark
- DM2A4
- Futlyar
- Mark 48 torpedo
- MU90 Impact
- Roketsan Akya
- Spearfish
- Tigerfish
- Torpedo 62
- Type 89 torpedo
- Type 65 torpedo
- Varunastra (torpedo)
- Yu-6 torpedo
