= Itaguaí =

- Municipality
- Município de Itaguaí
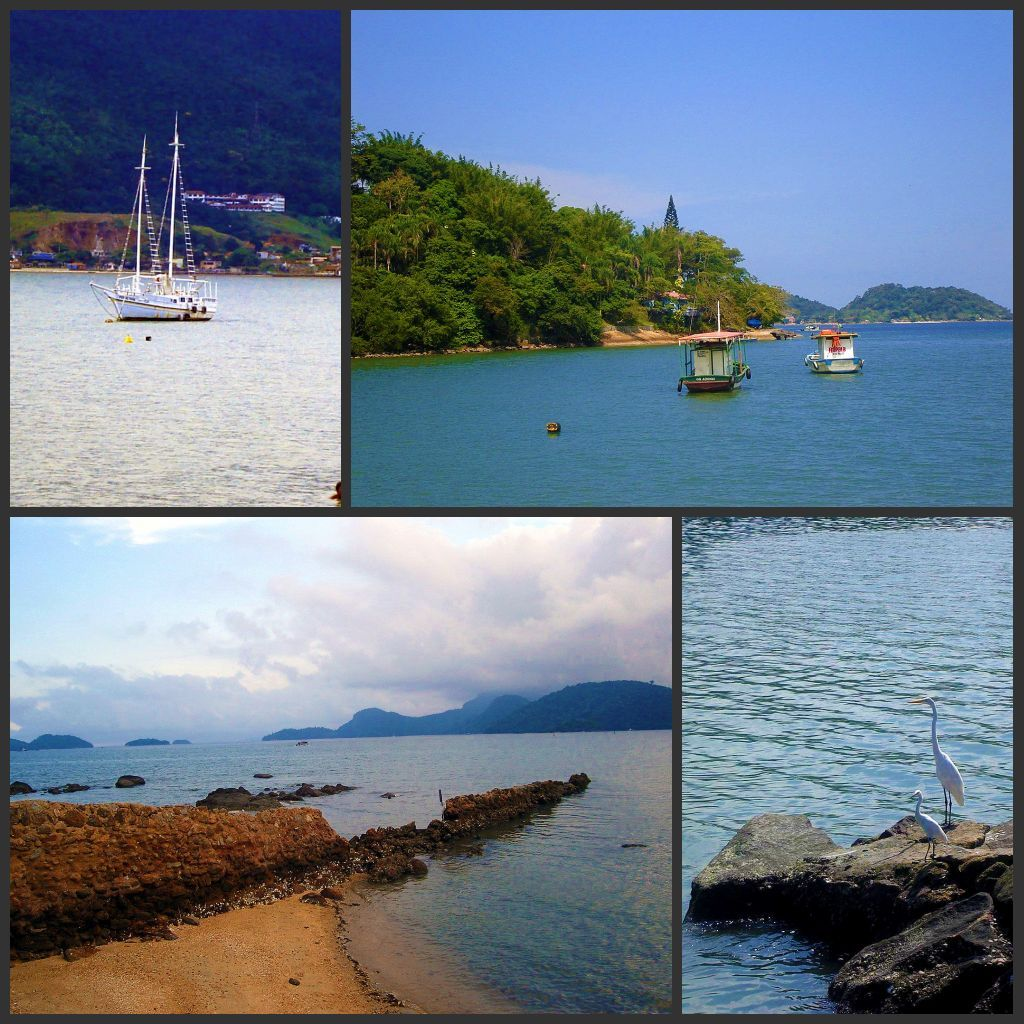

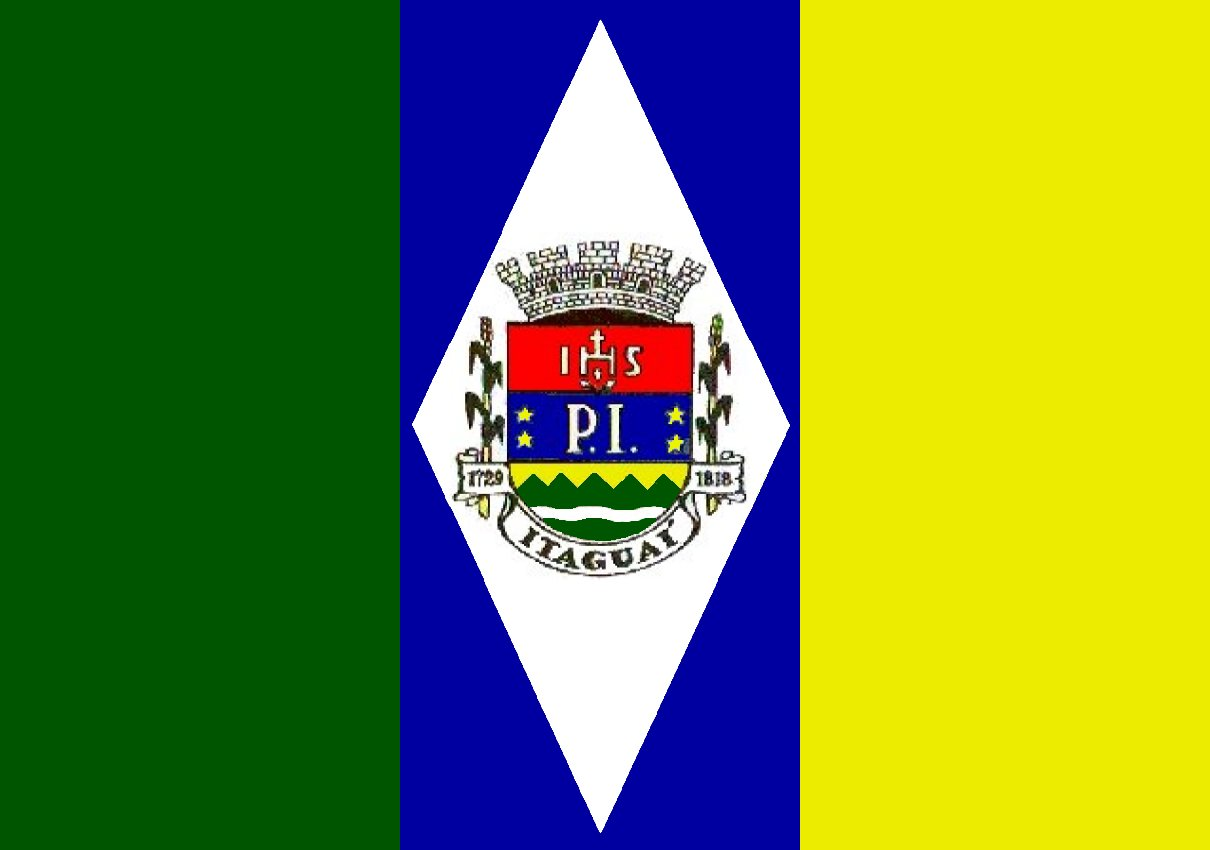
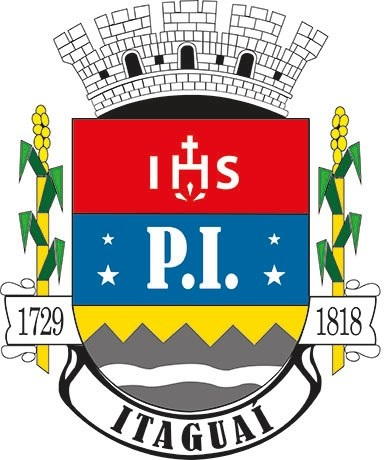
- Flag Coat of arms
- Nickname: Port city
- Location of Itaguaí in the state of Rio de Janeiro

- Location of Itaguaí in Brazil
- Coordinates: 22°51′07″S 43°46′30″W
- Country: Brazil
- Region: Southeast
- State: Rio de Janeiro

Government
  - Prefeito: Carlo Bussatto Júnio (PMDB)

Area
  - Total: 273.414 km^{2} (105.566 sq mi)
- Elevation: 15 m (49 ft)

Population (2022 Census)
  - Total: 116,841
  - Estimate (2025): 124,021
  - Density: 427.341/km^{2} (1,106.81/sq mi)
- Time zone: UTC−3 (BRT)

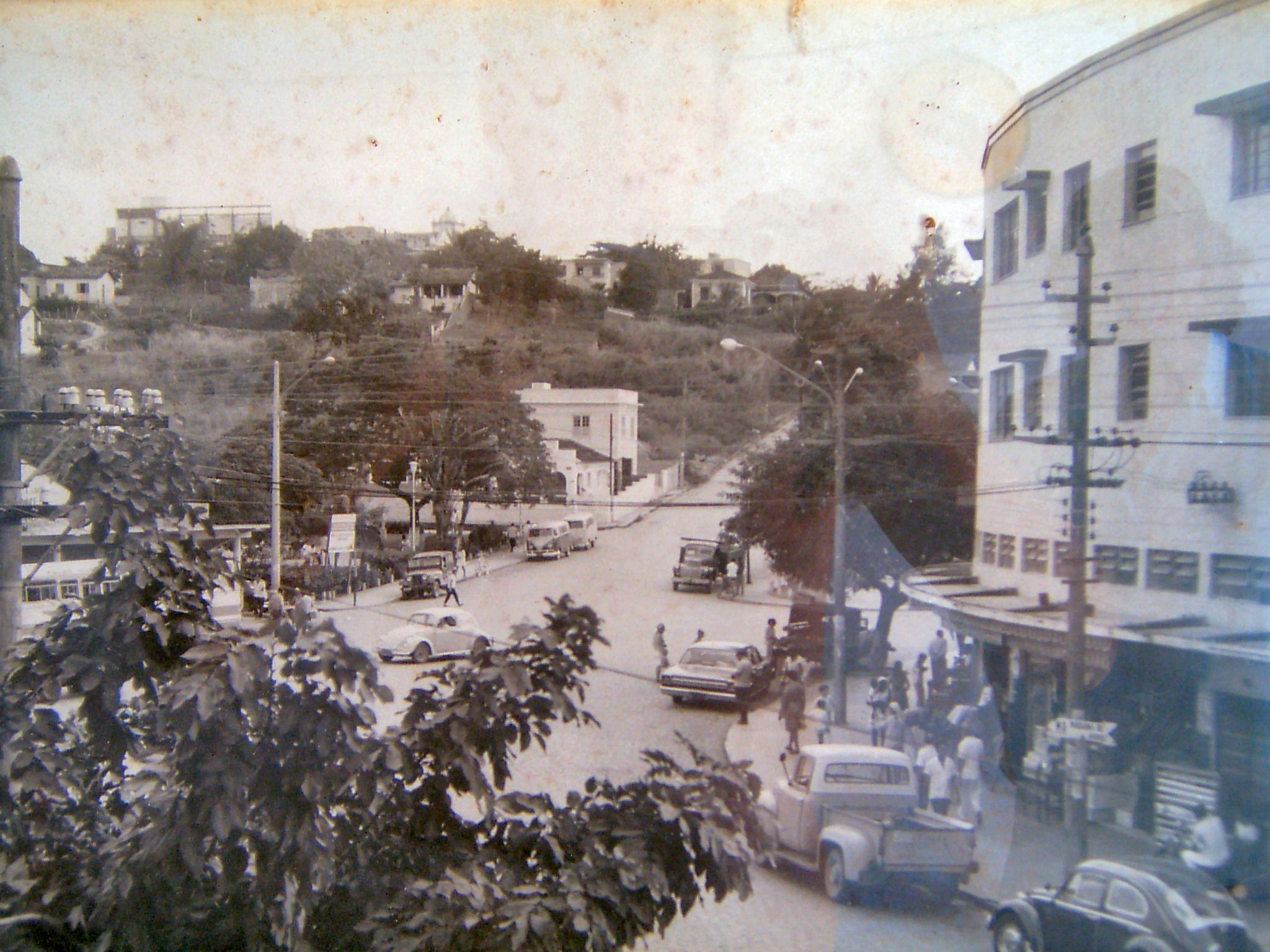
Itaguai in 1970

Itaguaí (Portuguese pronunciation: [itagwaˈi]) is a municipality located in the Brazilian state of Rio de Janeiro and contains several important iron ore loading ports of the world including Ilha Guaiba. Its population was 134,819 in 2020 and its area is 273 km^{2}. The city was founded in 1688 and lies midway between Rio de Janeiro and Angra dos Reis.

Itaguaí is located approximately 75 km west of the city of Rio de Janeiro on the road to Santos (SP). It is located between the shore of Sepetiba Bay and the Atlantic Rainforest.

Itaguai and the region around it contain some of the largest ore exporting ports in Brazil. It also serves also as dormitory town for workers of the industrial western zone (Zona Oeste) of Rio de Janeiro. It is the seat of the Roman Catholic Diocese of Itaguaí.

The former Brazilian footballer Ronaldo was born in Itaguaí

== Name ==
The name "Itaguaí" originates from the Old Tupi terms itá (stone), kûá (inlet/cove), and y (river). Hence, "river of the stone inlet/cove".

== Port of Itaguai (Sepetiba / Guaiba island) ==
The Port of Itaguai was opened as a deepwater port in 1982, primarily to export alumina and other minerals found in the Minas Gerais region. It includes ports of Itaguai, Sepetiba and Guaiba island. The port of Sepetiba is located in the port of Itaguaí. As of August 2018, the port accommodates large bulk carriers (170,000 deadweight). The Port of Sepetiba is further divided into two administrative regions - Sepetiba Bay and Sepetiba terminal.

The Port of Guaíba island (also known as Ilha Guaiba terminal), located close by has separate terminals for exporting mineral ores, but is privately owned by the mining company Vale and comes under the authority of the Port of Itaguai (Rio de Janeiro). Guaiba consists of deep water berths for loading the largest bulk carriers in the world, but has no residents and no road connections. Iron ore reaches the terminal through a railway bridge that connects the island to the mainland, and further, to the Vale mines in Minas Gerais. In March 2019, the port, which exports 40 million tonnes of iron ore each year, was closed by the local municipality due to excessive pollution and after the Brumadinho disaster in another mine in Brazil. The closure was short though, as a court injunction was granted to Vale a day later and the port resumed operations.

== Notable people ==
- Ronaldo, former footballer
