= Brazilian Blue Amazon =

Brazil's jurisdictional waters and continental shelf

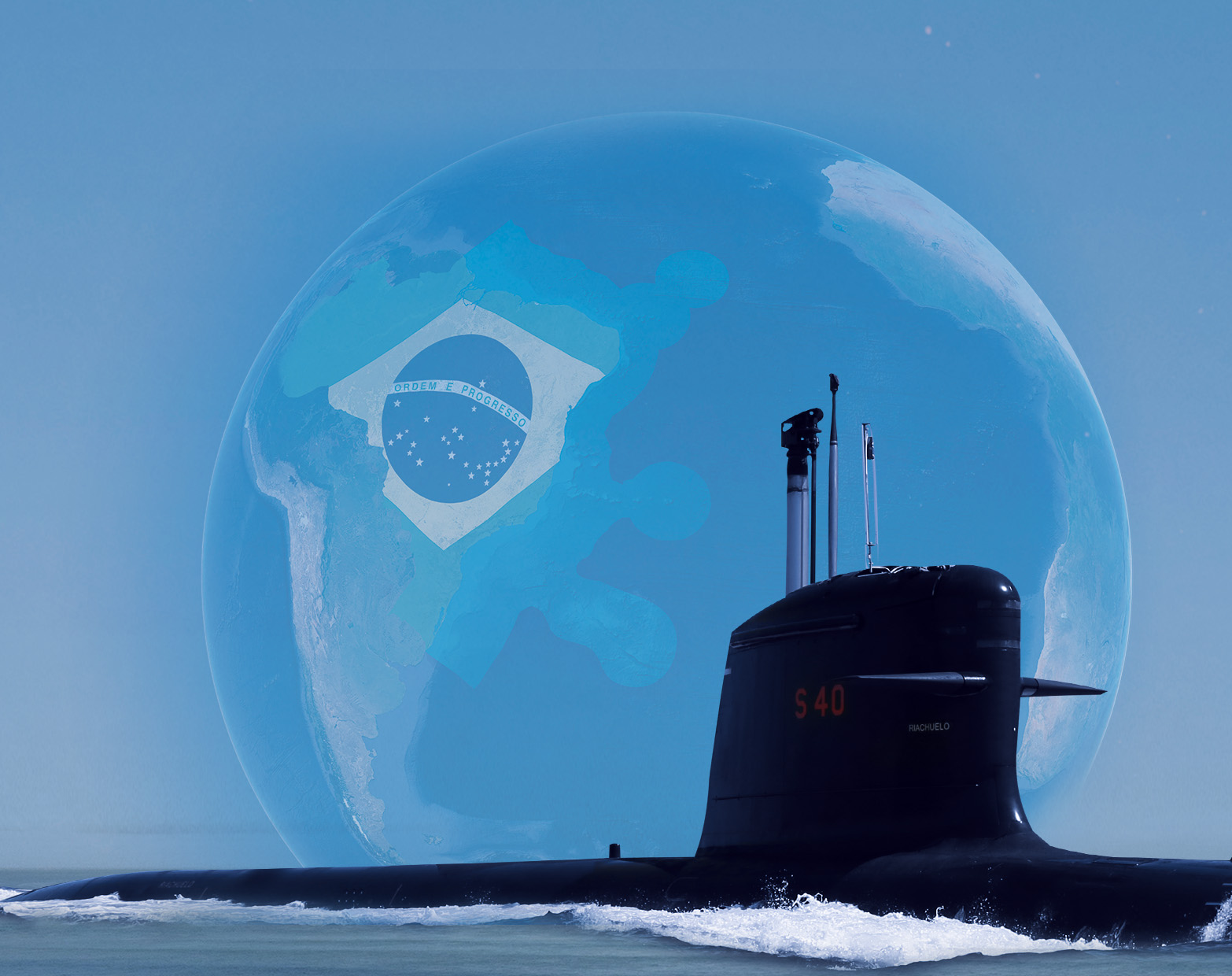
Navy promotional material depicting Brazilian maritime zones shaded on a globe in the background; in the foreground, the submarine Riachuelo (S-40), a product of investment programmes justified through the Blue Amazon

The Blue Amazon (Portuguese: Amazônia Azul) is the name given by the Brazilian Navy to Brazil's jurisdictional waters and continental shelf since 2004. The concept has a theoretical grounding in geopolitics and international relations and multiple facets — political-strategic, economic, environmental and scientific — with an emphasis in the first. It is a registered trademark and a central argument in the Navy's discourse for external and internal audiences, with additional usage by civilian sectors. More than an area, it is a propaganda discourse and a representation of the Brazilian perspective on the ocean's challenges and potentials, which are embedded in its analogy with the "Green" Amazon.

Its total claimed area covers 5.7 million square kilometers. Since the United Nations Convention on the Law of the Sea (UNCLOS) came into force, Brazil has expanded its maritime jurisdiction by occupying the Saint Peter and Saint Paul Archipelago and surveying the South Atlantic seabed to justify extended continental shelf proposals submitted from 2004 to 2018 to the United Nations Commission on the Limits of the Continental Shelf (CLCS). These proposals, and thus, the country's ultimate maritime boundaries, have yet to become final and binding under international law. By publicizing the concept of a Blue Amazon, the Navy intends to recover a "maritime mentality" within Brazilian identity after the 20th century's focus on land borders and the continental interior.

Brazil has inherited from its colonial history a coastal-centered population and relies on the sea for most of its external trade and petroleum and natural gas production. Marine pollution and overfishing burden its diverse ecosystems. Proponents of the Blue Amazon see it as an important environmental concern and a potential engine for technology-driven economic growth. Public policies for this sector are brought together by the Interministerial Commission on Marine Resources (Comissão Interministerial para os Recursos do Mar, CIRM), which is under the Navy's coordination. The Navy's mandate goes far beyond war: it is a coast guard, fields research vessels and scientific outposts, trains the merchant marine's officers and receives royalties from oil revenue.

In military thought, the "two Amazons" are resource-rich frontier zones where the state has a loose foothold, drawing in foreign greed which must be deterred by the Armed Forces. Perceived hypothetical threats are extraregional powers, which Brazilian strategists dream of keeping out of the South Atlantic, and unconventional threats such as international crime. By the 2010s, specialists agreed on the existence of shortcomings in naval combat and surveillance assets, but no conventional threat is felt in the short term. Newly discovered oil and gas reserves in the pre-salt layer encouraged ambitious naval re-equipment plans in the 2000s, but financial conditions deteriorated in the following decade and no political will was found to materialize the plans in their original form.

== Context ==
=== Maritime consciousness ===
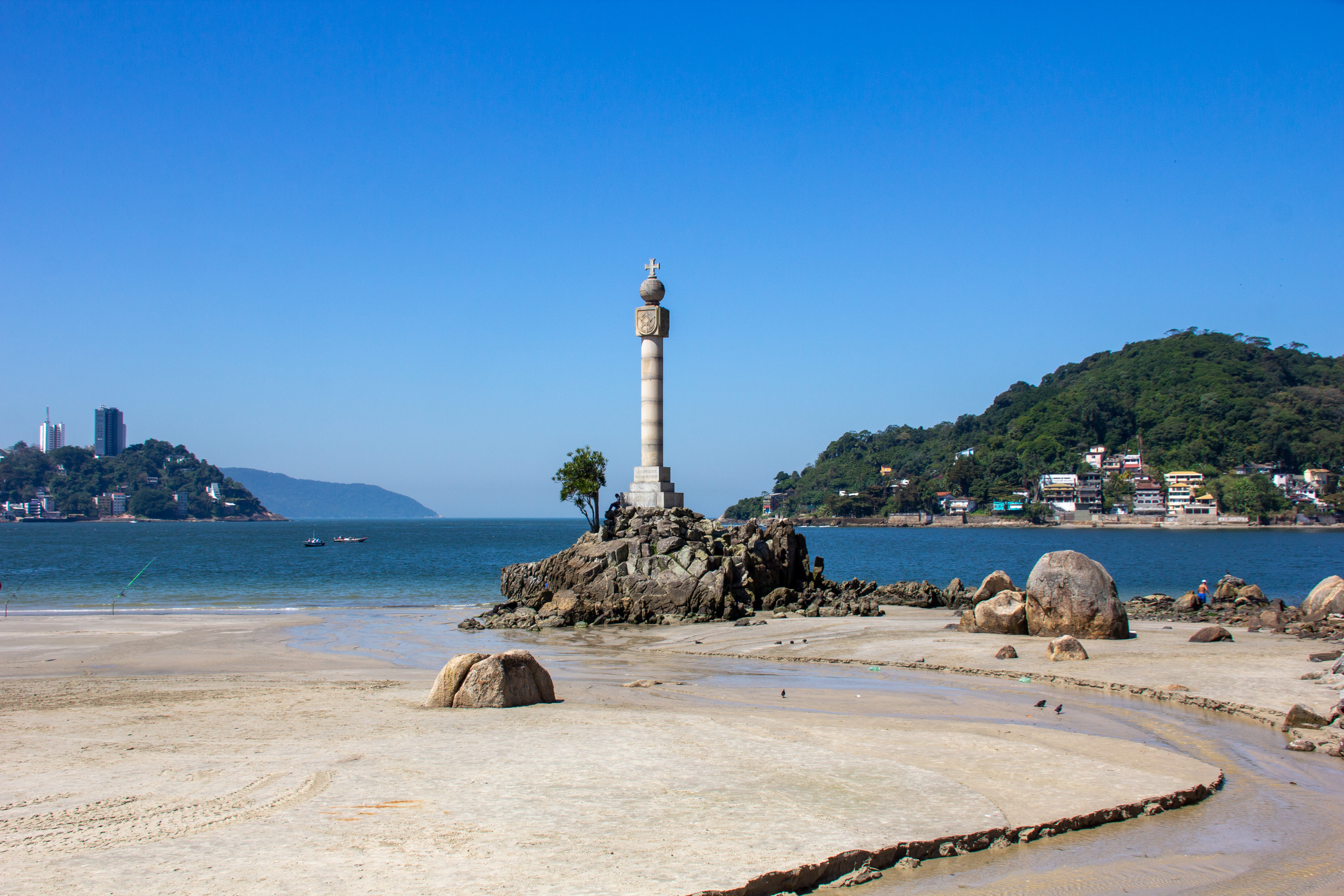
Seaborne colonization is at the source of the coastline's large urban clusters, such as the Baixada Santista, where the founding of São Vicente in 1532 is commemorated by a monument on an islet, the Marco Padrão

The concept of the Blue Amazon was launched to spread what the Navy calls a "maritime mentality" i.e. a conviction of the sea's importance to the nation, which needs to take root in the entire national community and not just the population employed in coastal and marine activities. According to the Navy's doctrines, Brazil has a neglected destiny in the ocean, a natural way forward dictated by its geographical heritage. Since the 1970s, naval intellectuals deplore the population's insufficient maritime mentality. The coastline of Brazil is the largest in the South Atlantic, but this has not by itself pointed the Brazilian polity towards the sea.

Brazilian history begins with Portuguese colonization from the coast. The bandeirantes and other agents of continental expansionism tripled the territory given to the Portuguese Empire under the Treaty of Tordesillas, but the continental interior was a demographic vacuum. Friar Vicente do Salvador commented in 1627 that Portuguese movements in Brazil "scraped along the sea like crabs". The sea and the coast were central to the "imaginative geography" of colonial and imperial times. By Independence (1822) the merchant marine, ports and shipbuilding were relevant to the national economy, and naval power would remain a governmental priority until the beginning of the following century.

In the 20th century, the political elite's projects were set on land, such as the March to the West, the highway-centered road network to the detriment of coastal shipping, the construction of Brasília and South American regional integration. Mário Travassos, patron of national geopolitics, was an advocate of "continental projection". The priorities were development of the interior and assurance of national sovereignty in the remotest corners of the country. By the 21st century, agricultural and urban expansion towards the North and Center-West is still ongoing, and land borders are still not adequately controlled.

The sea never lost its importance. Most of the population, industrial output and energy consumption are still within 200 km of the coast, and external trade and oil and gas production are almost entirely conducted in the sea. Since the 1970s, the state and geopolitical debates have recovered their interest in the sea, but public consciousness has more of a continental character. Opinion polls held in 1997 and 2001 had 66% and 73% of interviewees agreeing the sea is importance. Their main reasons were food and leisure; this vision of the sea has a land and coastal bias. Maritime transport, oil production and international maritime law are unknown topics to the public at large. In another poll in 2014, 60% agreed the Navy had a major contribution to the country, but only 10% could cite examples of its actions.

=== Territorial sea and EEZ ===
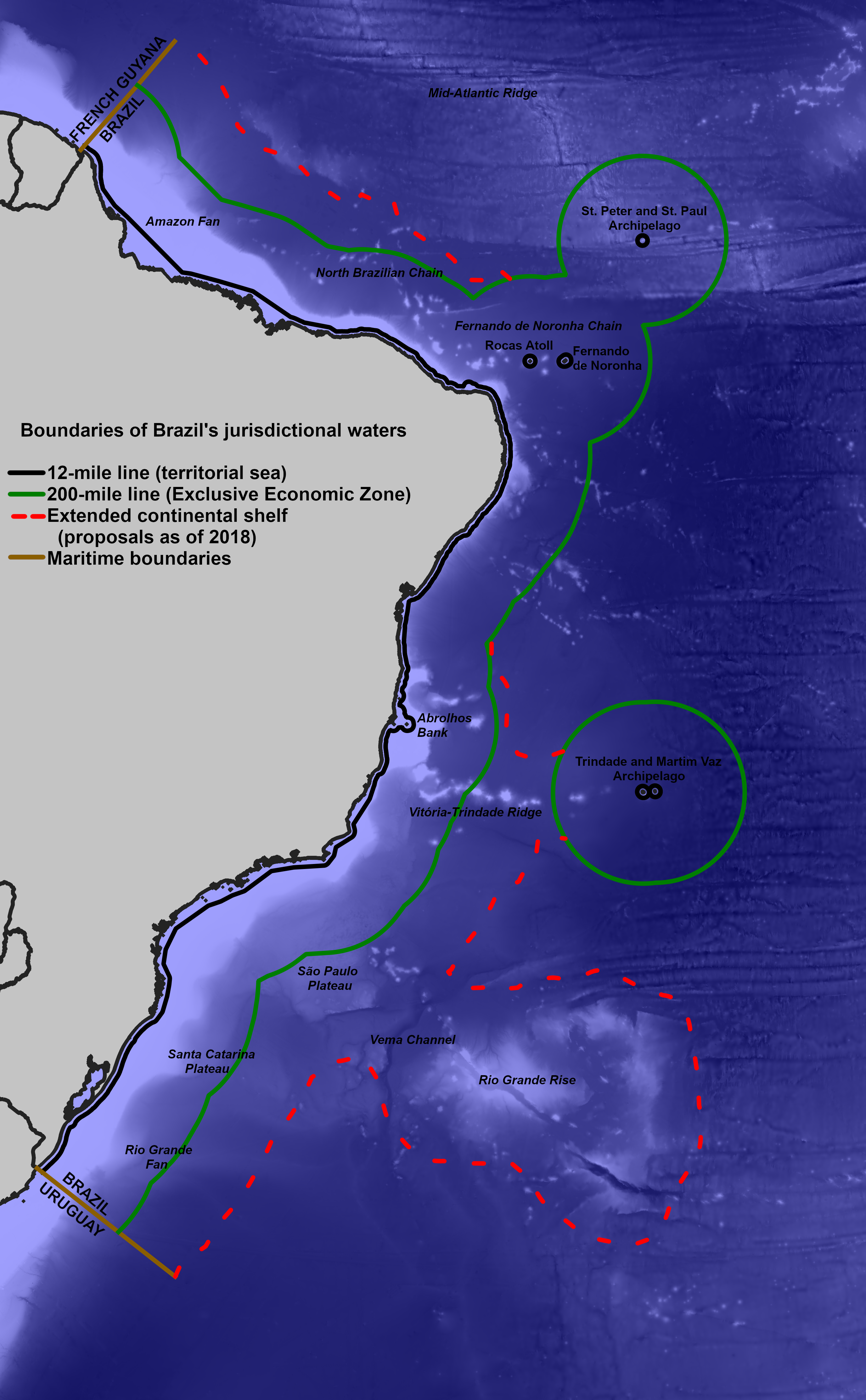
Limits of the territorial sea, EEZ and most recent continental shelf claims

The Blue Amazon is downstream of advancements in the regulation of maritime spaces and bases itself on maritime zones outlined in the United Nations Convention on the Law of the Sea (UNCLOS). Brazilian diplomats were active in the third United Nations Conference on the Law of the Sea (1973–1982), which produced the UNCLOS. Brazil was one of the "territorialist" states, which would ally with the "zonists" and others to draft a legal regime favorable to coastal states in their nearby waters, in opposition to the interests of traditional maritime powers and geographically disadvantaged states. The UNCLOS came into force in 1994 and assures its parties a territorial sea, contiguous zone and exclusive economic zone (EEZ) in waters along their coast. In the territorial sea, which stretches from baselines along the coast to a distance of 12 nautical miles (22 kilometres), a coastal state has full sovereignty over the airspace, waters, seabed and subsoil.

When Brazil harmonized the UNCLOS with its legislation, it dropped its unilateral 1970 claim to a 200 nautical miles (370 kilometres) territorial sea. Other Latin American states backed this claim, but it was received with protests from traditional maritime powers, and the fleet in 1970 had no condition to patrol the entire claimed area. As a party to the UNCLOS, Brazil secured rights over natural resources in the EEZ from 12 to 200 nautical miles away from the baselines. Within the EEZ, it has additional jurisdiction to police activities within a contiguous zone from 12 to 24 miles. Waters beyond the 200-mile line are part of the high seas. After the Convention came into effect, Brazil occupied the Saint Peter and Saint Paul Archipelago so that it could be considered an inhabited island and formalized an EEZ claim around this landform in 2004.

=== Continental shelf ===
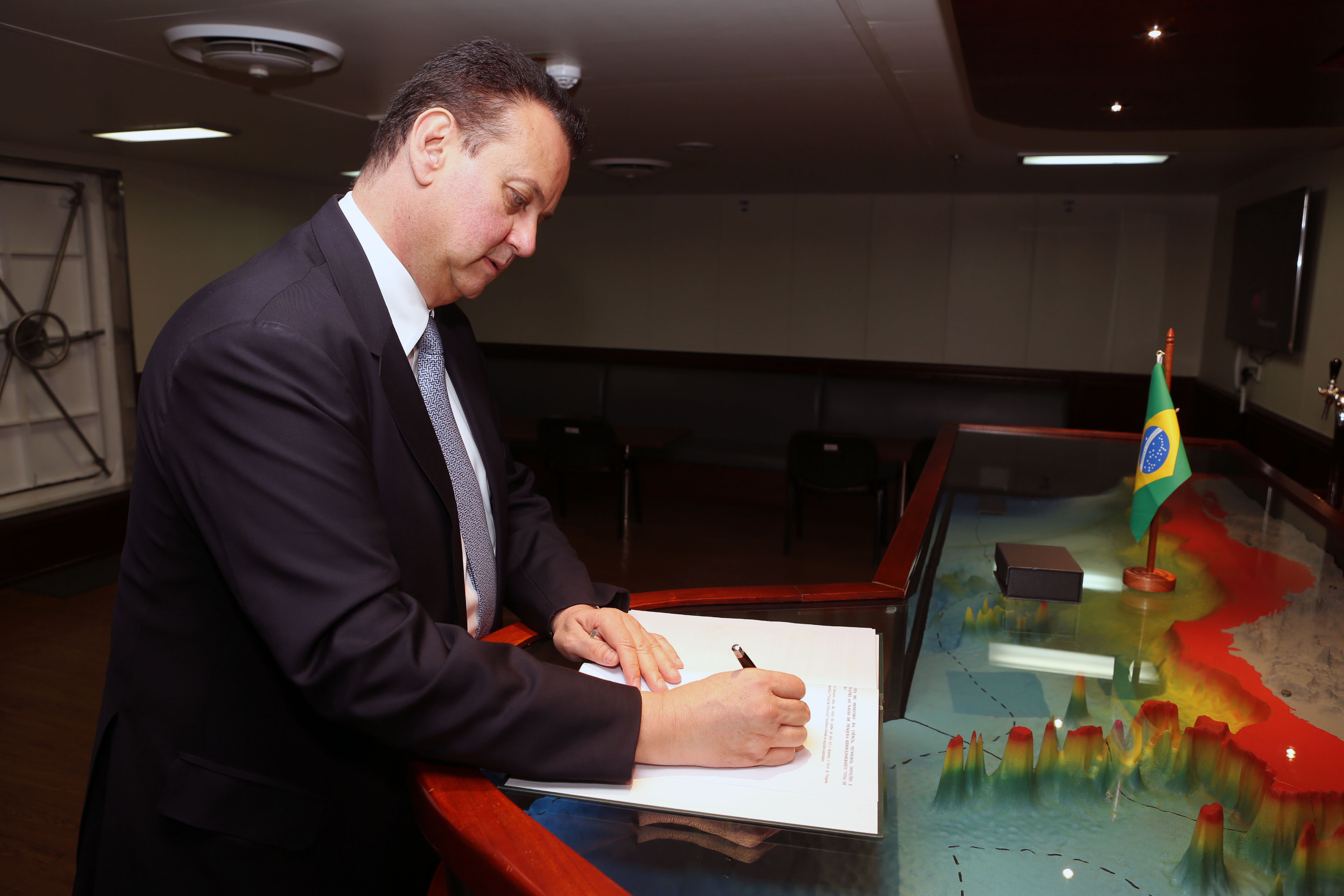
Gilberto Kassab, Minister of Science, Technology and Innovation, with a bathymetric model of the Brazilian continental margin aboard the research vessel Vital de Oliveira (H-39)

The seabed and subsoil's legal regime is distinct from that of the waters (territorial sea, contiguous zone, EEZ and high seas). Each coastal state has sovereign rights over natural resources in the submerged prolongation of its landmass, which is known as the continental shelf. Geologists and oceanographers call it the "legal continental shelf", as it is distinct from the continental shelf as identified by the natural sciences. The legal shelf's external boundary is the same 200-nautical mile line used by the EEZ, but it may be extended to greater distances with the consent of an international body, the Commission on the Limits of the Continental Shelf (CLCS). For this to happen, the interest state must survey the seabed and scientifically prove the natural prolongation of its territory towards the claimed area.

The continental shelf exists in Brazilian law since 1950, although under different terms and boundaries, and was the point of contention in the 1963 "Lobster War" against the French Navy. Even before the UNCLOS came into effect, the Brazilian government already sought to identify the outer boundaries of its shelf through the Brazilian Continental Shelf Survey Plan (Plano de Levantamento da Plataforma Continental Brasileira, LEPLAC), formalized in 1989. Data collection lasted until 1996. Four Navy research vessels, together with specialists from Petrobras and the scientific community, gathered 330.000 km of seismic, bathymetric, magnetometric and gravimetric profiles along the entire Brazilian continental margin.

LEPLAC substantiated a proposal to extend the continental shelf beyond 200 nautical miles. Its scientific and technical aspects were supervised by a working group coordinated by the Navy's Directorate of Hydrography and Navigation, while political aspects were coordinated by a representative of the Ministry of Foreign Affairs. The proposal was submitted to the CLCS on May 17, 2004. Diplomat Luiz Alberto Figueiredo describes the outer limit of the continental shelf as Brazil's last undefined legal boundary, as the problem of land borders has already been solved. The shelf, maritime zones surrounding oceanic islands and natural resources are the key points in Brazil's post-UNCLOS agenda for the ocean, which is particularly interested in the pre-salt layer's oil and natural gas reserves.

== Definition ==
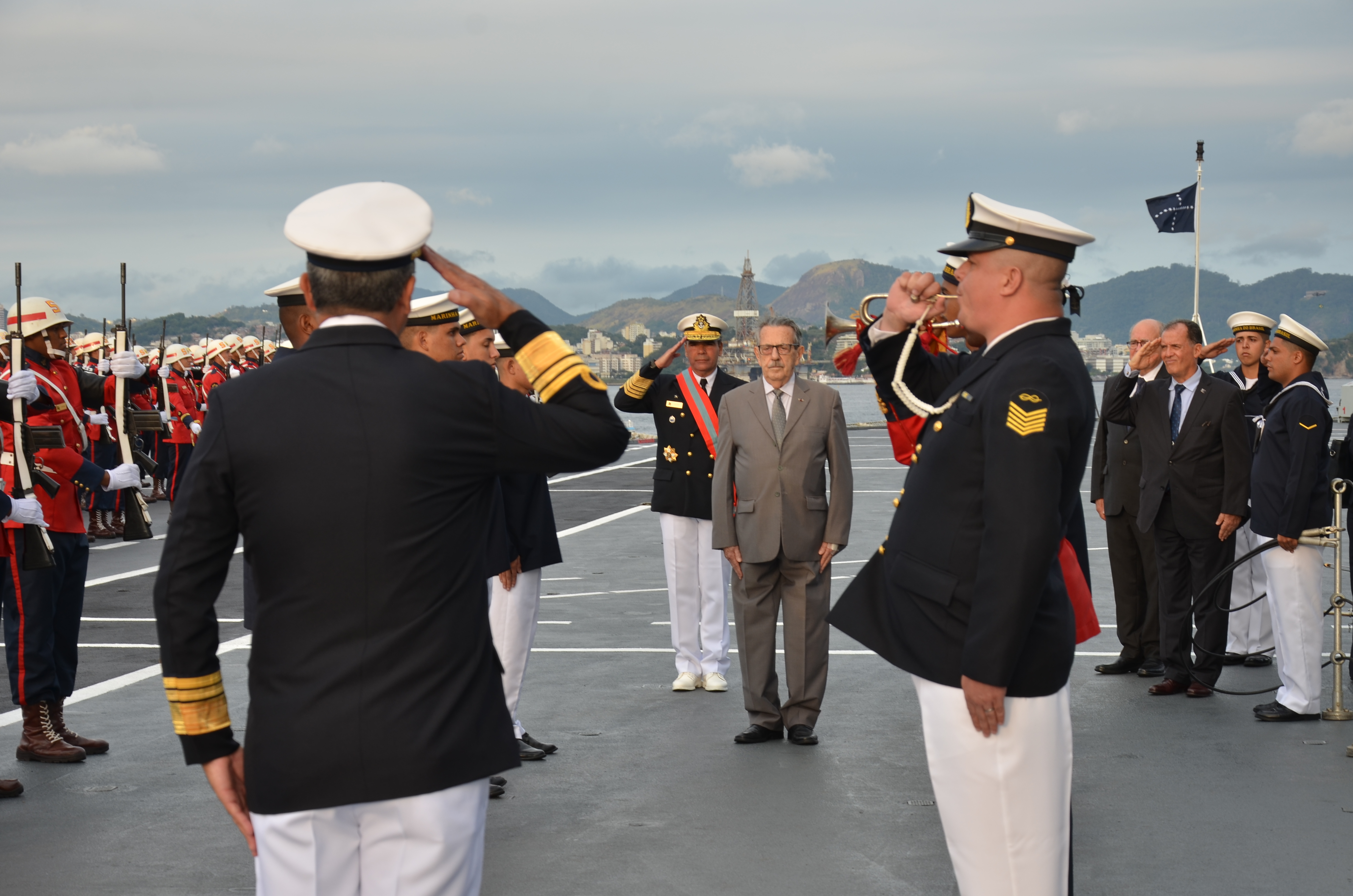
Admiral Roberto de Guimarães Carvalho (centered), earliest user of the concept

The term "Amazônia Azul" was first published on February 25, 2004, in an opinion column titled A outra Amazônia ("The other Amazon"), which was published in the Folha de S. Paulo by admiral Roberto de Guimarães Carvalho, Commander of the Navy at the time. It is no coincidence that this happened in the same year of the extended continental shelf proposal. According to admiral Armando Amorim Ferreira Vidigal, the idea had its roots in the LEPLAC surveys. Since then, this term is strongly tied to the Navy's identity and is used in its discourses for internal and external audiences. In 2009 the National Institute of Industrial Property recognized the expression as the Navy's registered trademark for events and promotional material". Outside the institution, it has been used by geopolitical thinkers, research institutes, environmental conservation agencies and other entities.

In his text, admiral Carvalho justified investments in the defense of "another Amazon, whose existence is still as ignored by much of the public as the other [i.e. the rainforest] was for many centuries. It is the "blue Amazon"". The area he wrote of was the EEZ and the continental shelf as defined in the UNCLOS. The Navy's current formal definition for this space is "the region which comprises the ocean surface, waters overlying the seafloor, seabed and subsoil contained within the atlantic expanse projected from the coast to the outer limit of the Brazilian continental shelf". This is the same area as the Brazilian jurisdictional waters (águas jurisdicionais brasileiras, AJB), which do have a legal definition and usage, whereas the Blue Amazon is a "less technical and more playful" term, with a "slight poetic touch", which has served as a blanket name for all maritime zones under Brazilian jurisdiction.

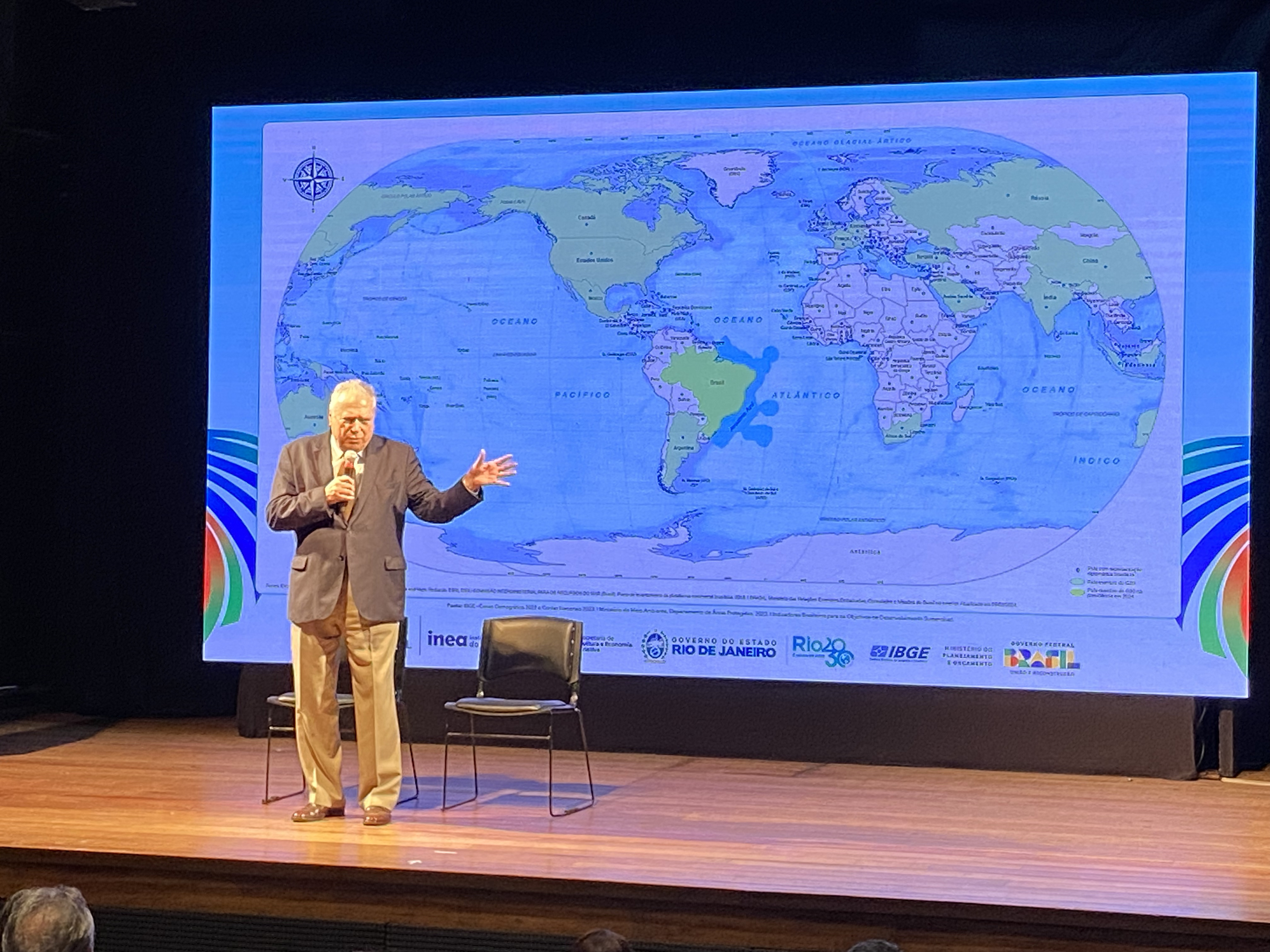
Publication ceremony for the Brazilian Institute of Geography and Statistics's 2024 School Atlas, with the Blue Amazon highlighted along the coast

Under such definitions, the Blue Amazon is an area or space. Alternatively, it is the governance and challenges of using the ocean under Brazilian jurisdiction, an analytical tool, a "propaganda discourse to sensitize public opinion", an instrument of strategic communication, a "banner raised by the Navy" and/or a representation of the state's will. More than a brand, it expresses a strategy, with most of its theoretical basis in the fields of international relations and geopolitics, particularly in oceanopolitics (ocean-centered geopolitics).

The equivalence between the Blue Amazon and the AJB is done by multiple authors, although a more limited definition of only the EEZ and continental shelf would exclude waters overlying the extended shelf, which are not Brazilian waters. The water column beyond 200 nautical miles is part of the high seas, even when the underlying seabed and subsoil are part of a state's extended continental shelf. But it is also true that Brazilian legislation explicitly includes waters overlying the extended shelf in the concept of AJB. For some authors, this is a contradiction between national and international law which might be brought to an international court. Admiral Júlio Soares de Moura Neto, Commander of the Navy from 2007 to 2015, used the terms as synonyms by mentioning "our jurisdictional waters, which we usually call Blue Amazon".

=== Total area ===
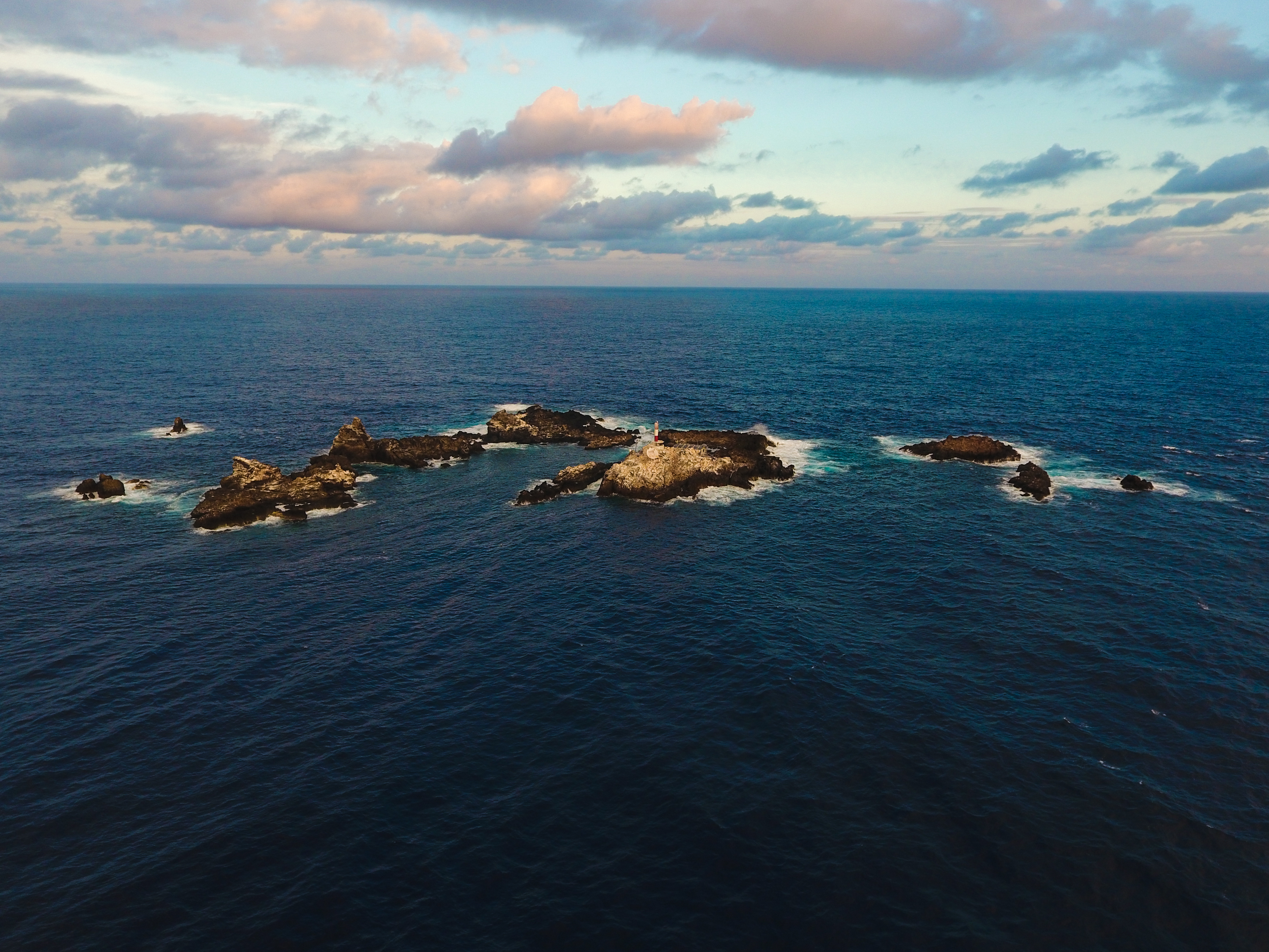
Archipelago of Saint Peter and Saint Paul

The Blue Amazon has an area of 3.575.195,81 km² within the EEZ's outer boundary, at 200 nautical miles from coastal baselines, and a further 2,094,656.59 km² of the most recent extended continental shelf claims, for a total of 5 669 852,41 km². This value is equivalent to 67% of national territory (8.5 million km²) and 1,1 times the size of the Legal Amazon (5.2 million km²). When the concept was introduced in 2004, the total area was at around 4.5 million km². The earliest extended shelf claim comprised 911,847 km², later increased to 953,825 km² in a 2006 addendum. Revised proposals were submitted in 2015 and 2018 . Other definitions include waterways, of which there are 60 thousand kilometers. The EEZ's area is relatively small compared to the length of the coastline (7,491 km), as Brazil has few remote oceanic islands. Three of them are counted as inhabited islands for purposes of EEZ projection: Fernando de Noronha, Trindade and Saint Peter and Saint Paul.

=== Objectives ===
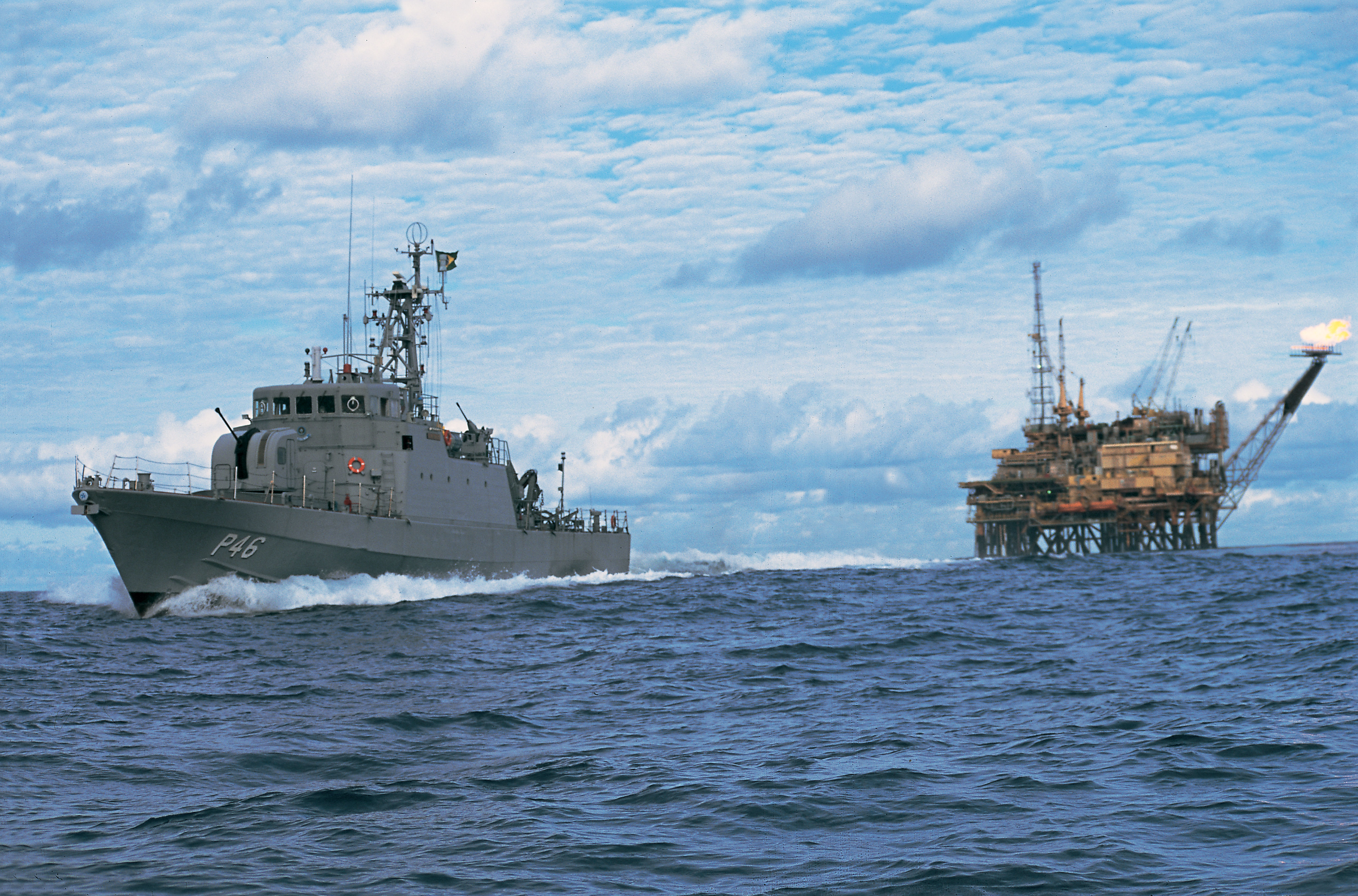
Political-strategic and economic facets: offshore patrol vessel Gurupá (P-46) sails past an oil platform

The concept's subdivision into four facets, or areas of interest to the Brazilian state — political-strategic, economic, scientific-technological and environmental — is the framing in which Brazil understands itself as a maritime power and communicates the Navy's roles. Besides a conventional military force, the institution is a port authority and a coast guard. The Commander of the Navy is the Brazilian Maritime Authority and as such, is responsible for implementing and policing laws and regulations on the sea and interior waters. To this end, a large number of patrol vessels are assigned to the Naval Districts, with further support from the Brazilian Air Force's patrol aircraft.

The Navy has responsibilities over navigation safety, environmental enforcement, lighthouse, weather station and communications operation and scientific and technological development. It trains all merchant marine officers, and they are a reserve force liable to wartime mobilization. These are sea management and not just sea defense tasks. A potential risk in the Blue Amazon's communication strategy would be to blur from public consciousness the Navy's roles in international waters.

By instilling the concept in the public mind, its proponents hope to revive maritime mentality and popularize the image of Brazil as a maritime nation. Naval strategists' discussions and academic research on the topic focus on is political-strategic, defense-focused facet, and the resulting ocean policy assumes a military bent. This can be contrasted with Portugal's National Ocean Strategy, in which the ocean is a project, not a destiny, and priorities are given to technology, the blue economy and environmental conservation.

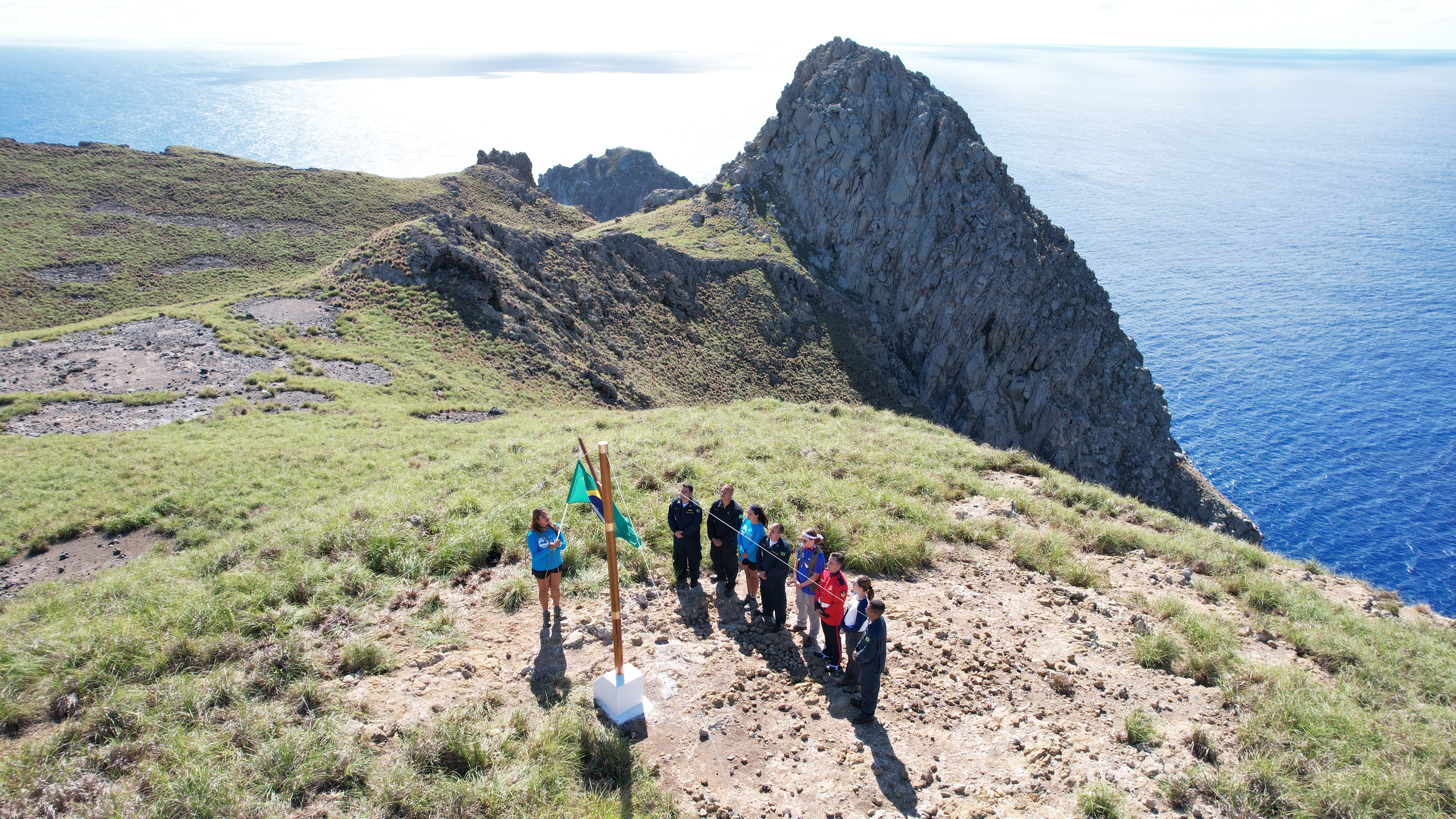
Political-strategic and scientific facets: military personnel and researchers hoist the national flag atop Trindade Island

José Augusto Fontoura Costa, a professor at the Law School of the University of São Paulo, the Blue Amazon's line of thought places investments into naval defense as the material condition to enforce possession of resources which have been secured on paper. This rhetoric is charged with the Navy's ambitions for a greater share of the federal budget and the public's attention. Therefore, it has "sophisms and weaknesses inherent to any discourse of political action". Even then, it "helps to redefine the perception of the Brazilian Armed Forces and retrieve extremely relevant questions on security and defense into national debate", bringing "many discussions formerly restricted to military and diplomatic strategists into public opinion", which might even result in the concept slipping from their "practical and semantic control".

In his dissertation at the War College (the Escola Superior de Guerra), Matheus Marreiro contended that the concept is "a top-down [Navy] project which attempts to construct national identity based on its own political and ideological conceptions". It is part of a political initiative to accrue "popular support for the creation of a maritime strategy, for attempts to expand national maritime boundaries and for the acquisition of new naval assets for defense of this space and resources". In this geopolitical discourse, the South Atlantic is presented as a natural zone of Brazilian influence and military power projection. This is not necessarily the only geopolitical paradigm for the South Atlantic, and the region can also be studied from the perspective of the Ministry of Foreign Affairs, environmentalists and other states.

== The Amazon as a metaphor ==
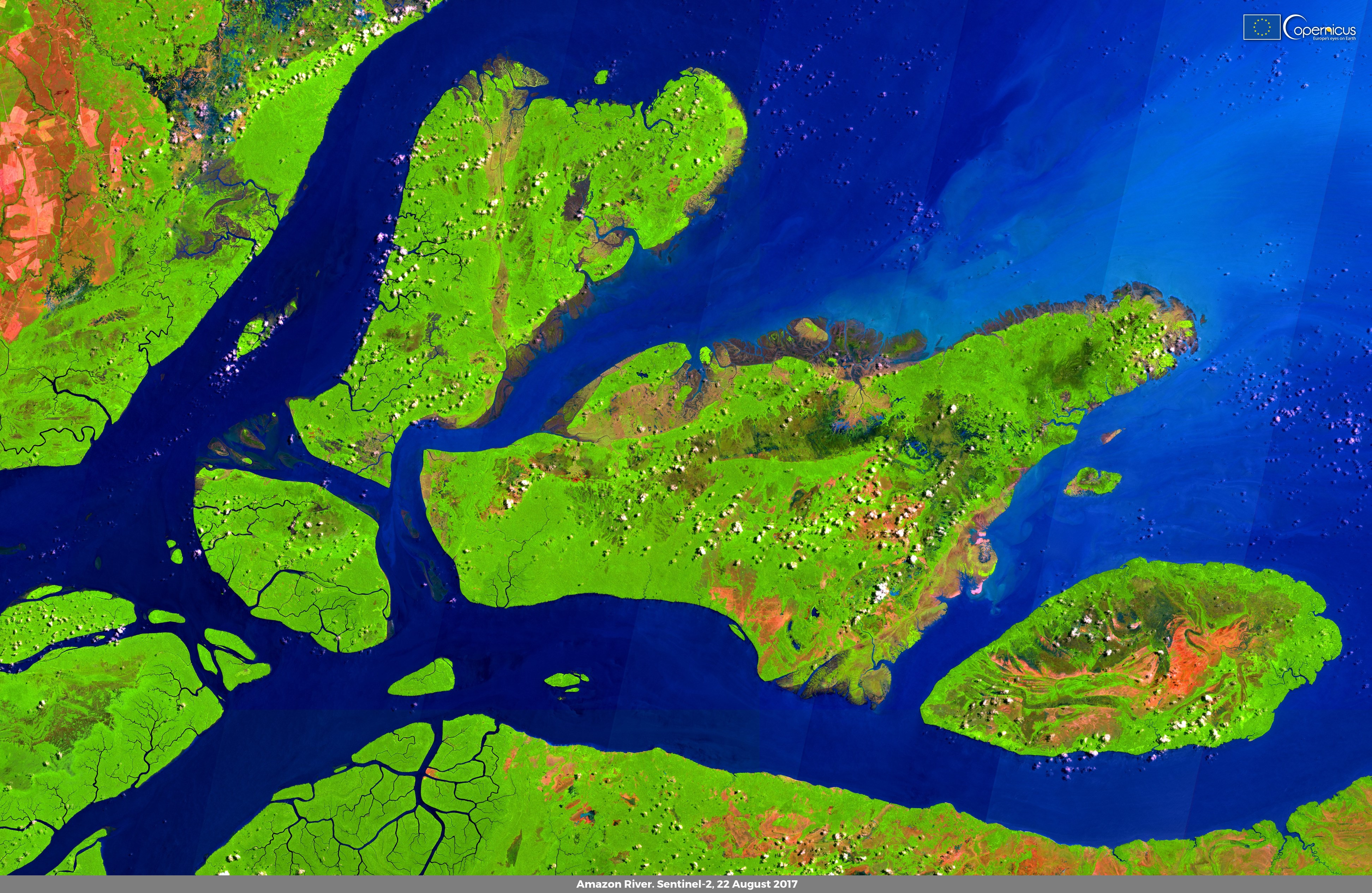
The Amazon Delta, where the "two Amazons" meet

Amazônia is a loaded word and is transposition into the sea is a semantic appropriation. Public imagination ties the Green Amazon to natural resources, biodiversity and environmental and sovereignty concerns. According to admiral Carvalho, his concept does not compete with the Green Amazon, but merely takes advantage of its popularity. The Navy has riverine components and has also contributed to the military buildup in the Green Amazon, although at a slower pace than other branches of the military. Its focus is on blue waters and admiral Vidigal has even criticized it for neglecting its riverine side.

The "two Amazons" have important distinctions. Their legal regime is not the same: Brazilian sovereignty is full over the Green Amazon, but limited to natural resources in the EEZ and continental shelf. For this reason, the Blue Amazon should not be called the "Brazilian maritime territory", as some authors have done, for only the territorial sea is part of Brazilian territory. Furthermore, the Blue Amazon's human dimension, with a population of sailors and oil rig workers, cannot be compared to the Green Amazon's where resource extraction disturbs populations unadapted to modern modes of production.

Navy and Army officers find it valid to study the "two Amazons" as a whole, without denying their peculiarities. Several external threats are deemed common to both. From the military perspective, an "Amazon", irrespective of its color, has three points in common: its size, its strategic natural resources and the necessities of presence and defense. Admiral Carvalho's opinion column deplored that the Green Amazon had recently received government initiatives such as the Calha Norte Project and the Amazon Surveillance System, for which there were no correspondents in the Blue Amazon. By this period, political and military authorities were realizing that their ambition to assert sovereignty and state presence over the land border, the "vacuum" they had to fill (the Green Amazon), was far from complete. At the same time, the maritime border, while no less important, had been neglected. A new effort would be needed to consolidate national presence in the maritime space which the nation was entitled to. "Final frontier", a common military epithet for the Green Amazon, has been applied to the Blue Amazon.

=== Economics ===
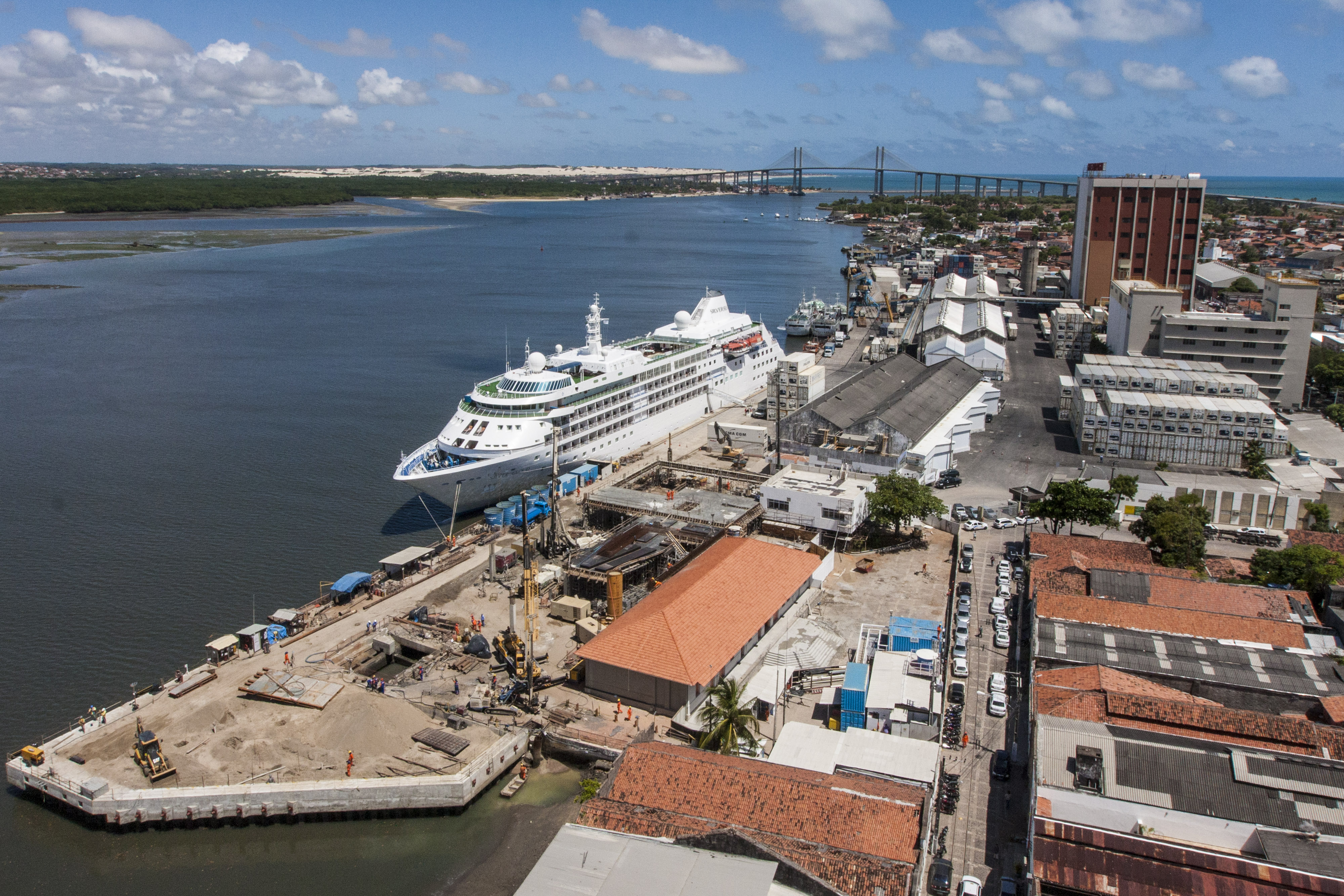
Cruise ship in the Port of Natal, Rio Grande do Norte

Natural wealth is always remembered in military depictions of the Green Amazon. In 1998, Army Minister Zenildo de Lucena presented it as the "world's greatest reserve of tropical rainforest, an inheritance from the sacrifice of our predecessors". Admiral Carvalho called the Blue Amazon "unimaginably rich", clamored for its "rational and sustained exploitation" and highlighted two strategic activities, international trade and oil and gas extraction. The concept's proponents hope for it to become an engine of technology- and innovation-driven economic growth. Sustainable development through the sea is a new economic frontier, the blue economy.

The full extent of the Blue Amazon's resources is unknown. The maritime share of the national gross domestic product (GDP) is not yet officially measured, but there are academic estimates. As of 2015 the maritime economy was estimated to have directly and indirectly provided an output of R$ 1.11 trillion, or 18.93% of national GDP, and 19,829,439 jobs. Activities directly tied to the sea, equivalent to 2.67% of the GDP, are dominated by the service sector, particularly tourism.

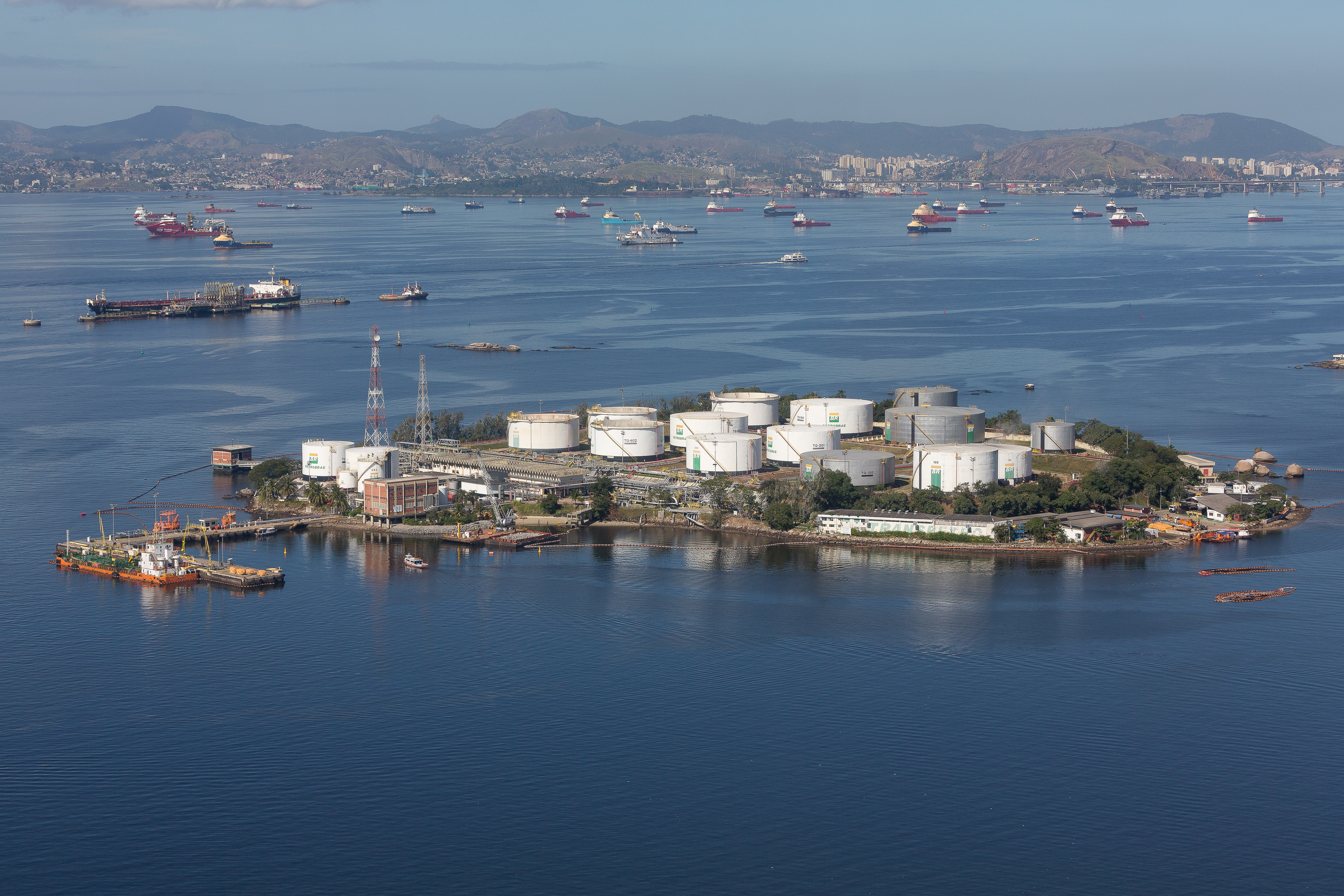
Transpetro terminal on Ilha d'Água, Rio de Janeiro

International shipping hauled 88.9% of export value and 74% of imports in 2023. Brazil's merchant marine is poorly represented in this trade, although ships built in the country and flying the national flag once had a greater participation in the past. Shipbuilding remains active, driven by the oil industry's demand. On internal trade, coastal shipping, which was once the only mode of transport between urban centers along the coast, provided for a mere 15% of transport demand in 2015. Several submarine cables, a critical international communications infrastructure, cross Brazilian waters.

Most petroleum and natural gas production in Brazil takes place at sea and specifically in the pre-salt layer, beneath kilometers of rock. Production increases continually since pre-salt drilling began in the late 2000s, and by 2018 Brazil had the world's 14th largest oil reserves. National authorities were enthusiastic over the new oil frontier, as fuel production is a bottleneck in the country's economic history. In theory, Brazil became self-sufficient, but due to a lack of refinery capacity, it still imports crude oil and its derivates. According to Petrobras, production will decrease by the late 2020s. The Brazilian equatorial margin is a new exploration frontier, but the corporation has yet to be authorized by the Brazilian Institute of Environment and Renewable Natural Resources to drill most fields.

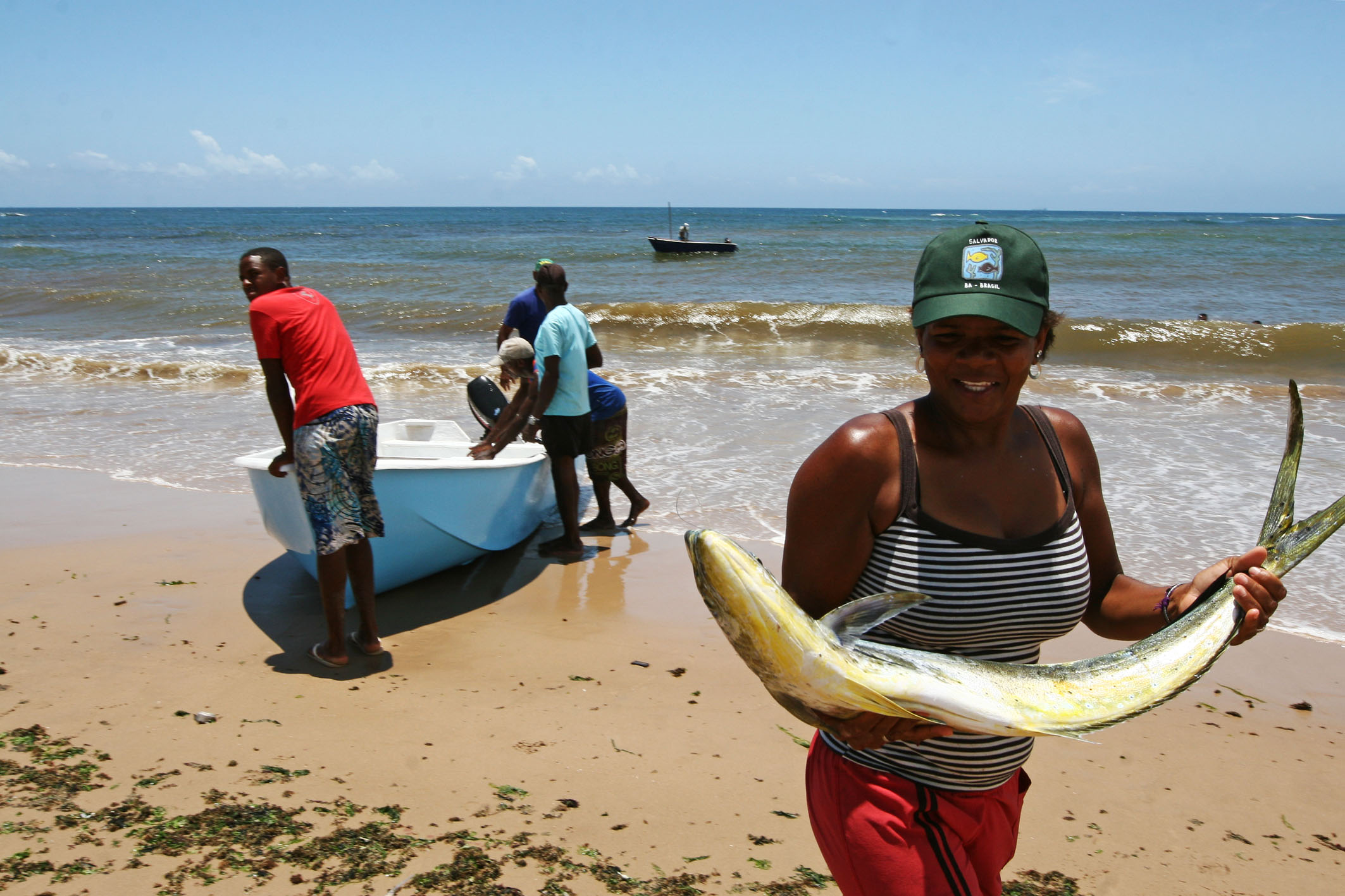
Artisanal fishermen in Pituba beach, Bahia

The seabed and subsoil of the South Atlantic are also a new frontier for undersea mining, whose potential is not yet fully known, but interest tends to increase as mines dry up on land and marine exploration technology improves. The Brazilian continental shelf has deposits of coal, gas hydrates, aggregates, heavy mineral sands, phosphorites, evaporites, sulphur, cobalt-rich ferromanganese crusts, polymetallic sulfides and polymetallic nodules. Few of these resources are exploited at present. Undersea mining has deep environmental impacts and is only viable when comparable resources are not exploitable at lower costs on land.

In fishing, Brazil's industrial fleet catches less than 1% of global output. Brazil's large area of jurisdictional waters does not by itself make it a fishing powerhouse, as the warm and nutrient-poor waters of the Brazil and North Brazil ocean currents do not sustain large biomasses of fish. Artisanal fishing does have major social value, as it sustains the livelihoods of over a million fishermen and their families. Brazilian seas have idle potentials for biotechnology and renewable energy generation (tidal, wave, wind and osmotic power and ocean thermal energy conversion).

=== Environment ===
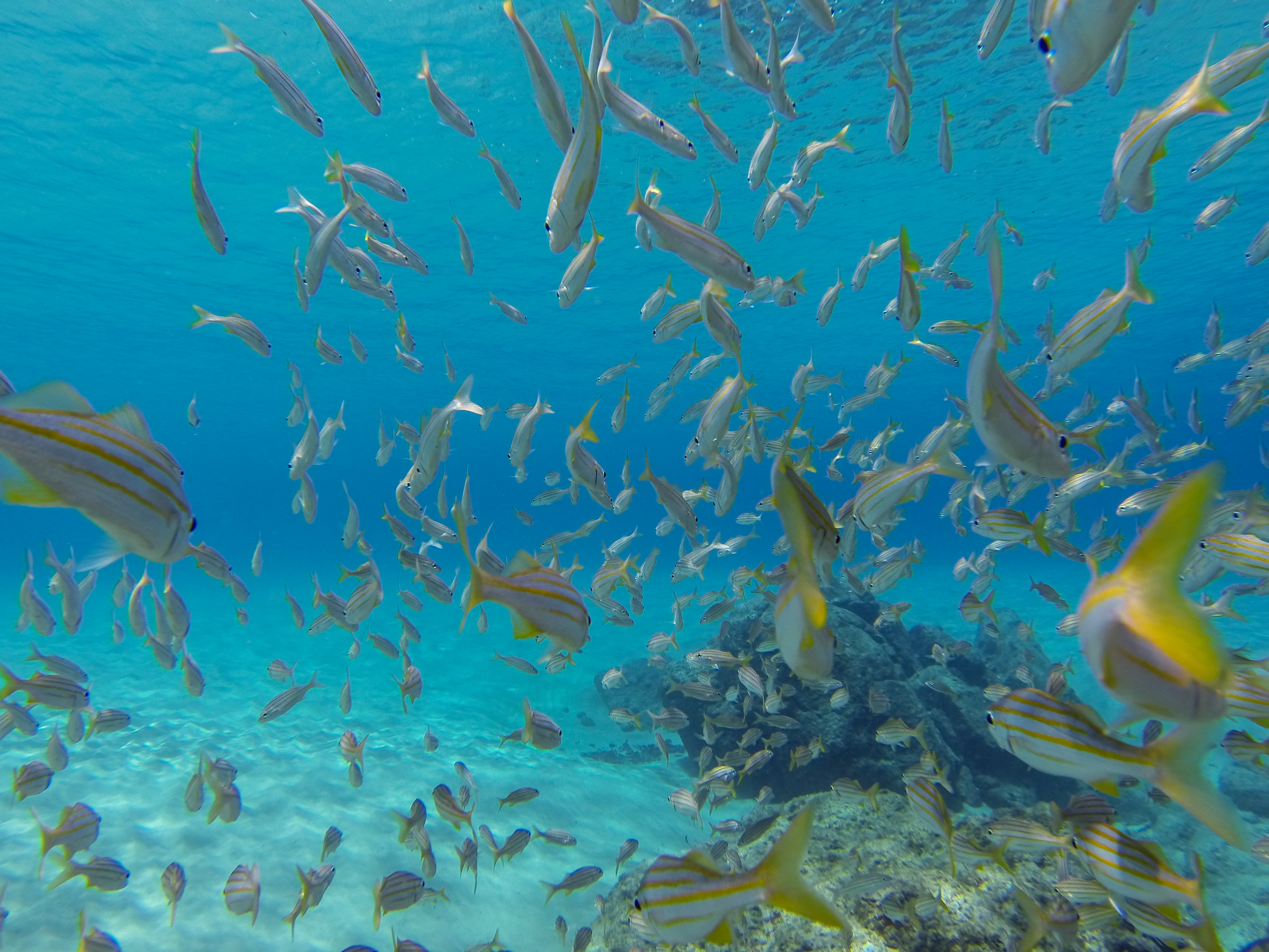
Shoaling fish in Fernando de Noronha

Official discourse equals the "grandeur of our tropical rainforest", as in its wealth and the vulnerability of its biological patrimony, with the Blue Amazon's biological "treasure". As of 2011, researchers have identified 9,103 species of marine life in Brazil. Its marine ecosystem is vast, hydrologically and topographically complex and exhibits high levels of endemism. Distinct communities live in mangrove forests, restingas, tidal flats, dunes, cliffs, bays, estuaries, coral reefs, beaches, rocky shores and other coastal environments, as well as sedimented slopes, submarine canyons, reef-forming or solitary corals, methane seeps and pockmarks, seamounts and guyots in deeper waters.

The Blue Amazon's political strategists do not ignore environmental conservation, but it is not the concept's highest priority. Demographic concentration in the coast is a major challenge. Those ecosystems are under stress from overfishing, navigation, port and land pollution, coastal development, mining, oil and gas extraction, invasive species and climate change. The most critical combinations of risk factors and biodiversity are in unprotected areas of the Southeast and southern Bahia. Protected area coverage in the EEZ rose from 1.5% to 25% in 2020 after new units were created around the archipelagos of Trindade and Martin Vaz and Saint Peter and Saint Paul, allowing Brazil to announce it had fulfilled the numerical conservation target it had assumed at the Convention on Biological Diversity. Those are remote areas, where conservation will hurt fewer economic interests.

=== Security ===
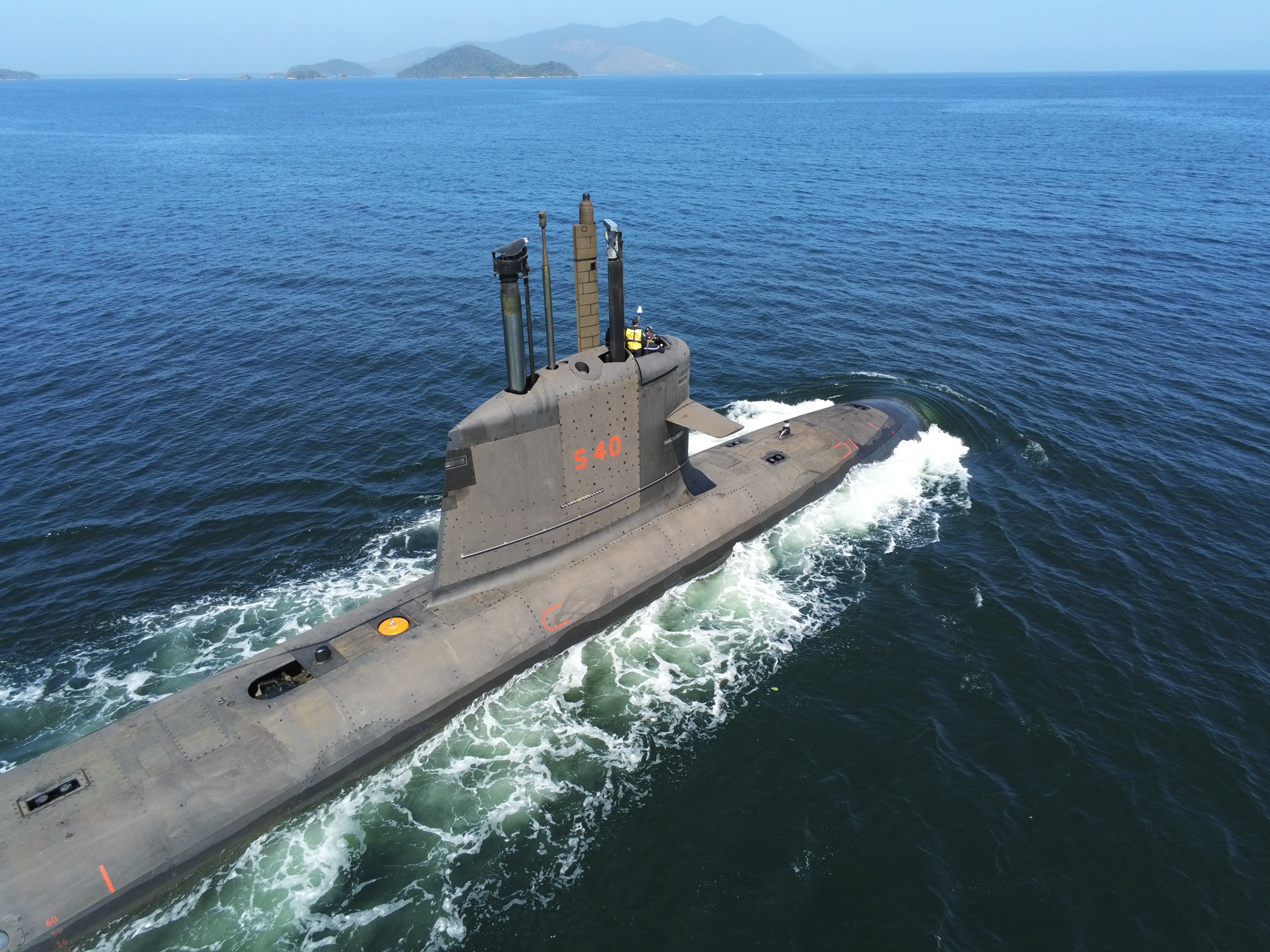
Riachuelo (S-40), the first vessel obtained under the Submarine Development Program

A typical assumption in the Blue Amazon's discourse is that the existence of natural resources in an area implies a duty of military occupation. The state's thin presence attracts foreign greed — and old understanding on the Green Amazon which has been transposed to its Blue counterpart. Military spokesmen fear "international covetousness" of Amazonian wealth, which could materialize as unconventional threats, a conventional military intervention or even the internationalization of the Amazon. This has been used to justify a military buildup in the Green Amazon since the late 20th century.

Likewise, the Blue Amazon is key to the Navy's arguments to modernize its operational assets; admiral Carvalho opened his opinion column with the proposition that "any wealth ends up as a target of covetousness, imposing on its owner the burden of protection", and in the final paragraph, pondered that "the limits of our jurisdictional waters are lines over the sea. They do not physically exist. What defines them is the existence of ships in patrol". Nationalist and military sectors of society are particularly concerned with the security of oil and gas reserves in the continental shelf. In official discourse, the South Atlantic as a whole is a strategic, threatened and poorly controlled region.

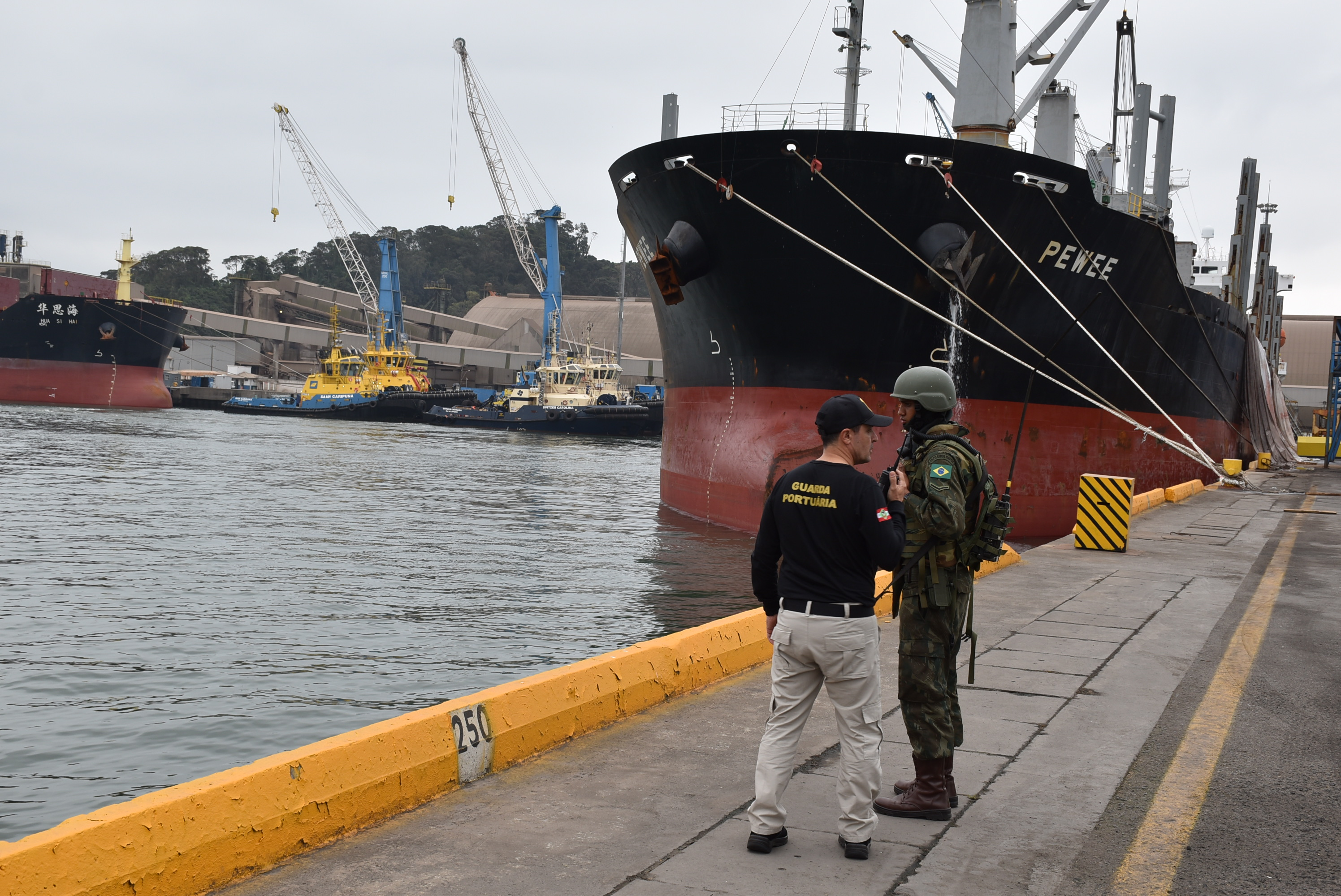
Civilian port guard and marine infantryman in the Port of São Francisco do Sul, Santa Catarina

No clear enemy was presented by the Blue Amazon's propaganda, hampering a full persuasion of the public, according to journalist Roberto Lopes. Conventional threats seemed distant in the post-Cold War setting. An analyst at the United States Naval Institute observed in 2009 that there was little to no public discussion in Brazil over the threat that would need to be deterred by one of the Navy's main programmes, the nuclear submarine. The South Atlantic is a "traditionally peaceful zone", as defined by former Defense and Foreign Affairs minister Celso Amorim. Unlike the North Atlantic, it is a peripheral region to the world's main commercial flows and political-strategic concerns, in the consensus of international specialized literature. (Note: The North Atlantic has a greater volume of maritime traffic due to the larger populations on its shores and the Suez and Panama canals, which shorten connections to the Pacific and Indian Oceans which would otherwise pass through the South Atlantic. Nonetheless, these canals cannot absorb all international trade, and South-South commercial relations keep the South Atlantic relevant to an extent.) Brazil has cordial relations with its neighbors on land and, under the United States's hegemony, the likelihood of a regional war is low and the country has allowed itself to maintain a low military readiness. Brazil's deterrence strategy has no official target.

In a dissertation for the Naval War College, Felipe Malacchini Maia analysed weaknesses and potential threats to the Blue Amazon, with the caveat that "there is no intention to alarm or to point to the imminence of a threat to Brazil at sea or from the sea, which must be said in advance to not exist". Based on a realist theory of international relations, he considered anything that could be used against the country and not the political alignment of other countries, which at the moment of publication (2020), did not indicate a threat — but the political environment can always change. Hypothetical threats are both classical (regular state forces) and non-classical (substate groups). His analysis went beyond jurisdictional waters to cover the entire Brazilian strategic contour, which, from the Navy's perspective, consists of a "vital area", the Blue Amazon, a "primary area", the Atlantic from the 16th parallel north to Antarctica, and a "secondary area", the Caribbean Sea and East Pacific Ocean. Within the vital area, priorities are given to the strip between Santos and Vitória, the Amazon Delta, archipelagos, oceanic islands, oil platforms and naval and port installations.

==== Non-state threats ====
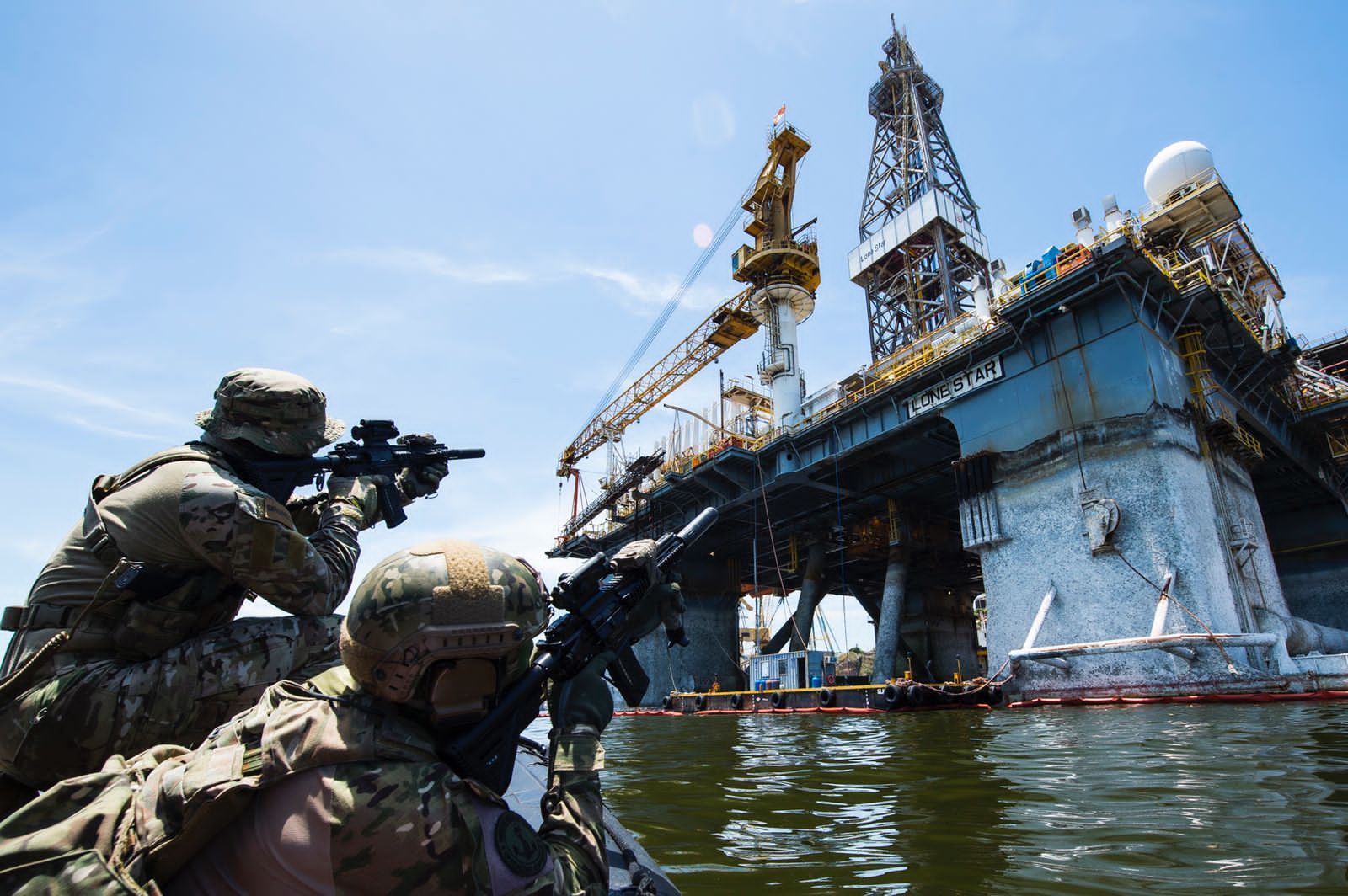
GRUMEC oil platform infiltration exercise

The Brazilian government has expressed concern over "new maritime threats" such as piracy, terrorism, drug, arms and human trafficking, environmental crimes, illegal fishing, biopiracy and other transnational crimes. Some are already present in the West African coast and may in the future reach Brazil's maritime lines of communication. The Navy frequently encounters illegal dumping and other environmental violeations. "Ghost ships" which deliberately hide their position and movements may be used for the aforementioned crimes, unauthorized geological and biological surveys and espionage and data theft from submarine cables.

Vessels on internal and territorial waters face occasional cases of armed theft, which is more of a police than a defense issue. Incidents with illegal fishing boats are common on international waters close to Brazil. On Argentina, this has led to the boarding, seizure, pursuit and even sinking of such ships. A Brazilian fishing boat was attacked by a Chinese boat on international waters in 2018, and the president of the Rio Grande do Norte Fishing Union commented at the time that "there's a war at sea, a war over tuna".

==== State threats ====
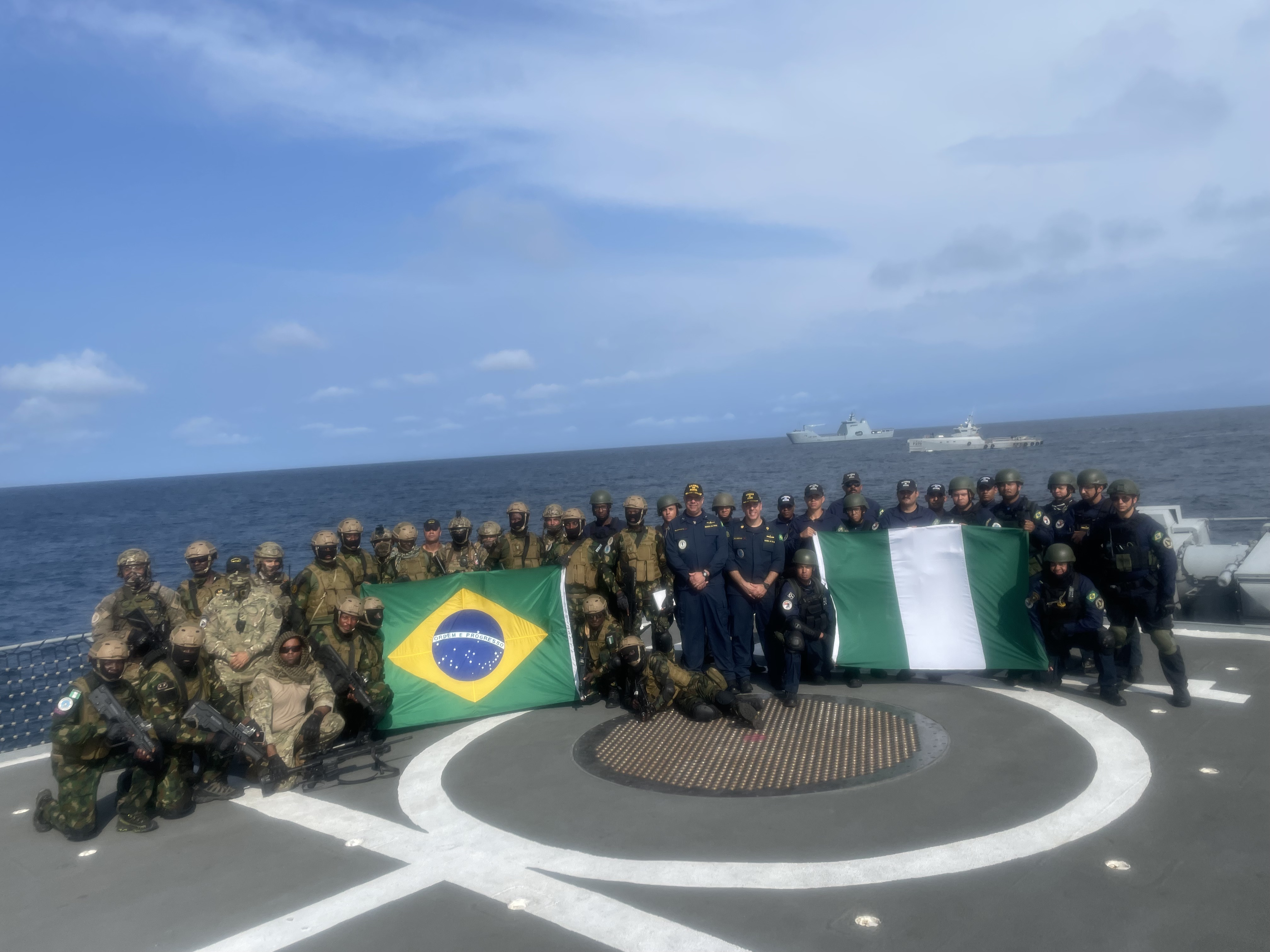
Joint Brazilian-Nigerian naval exercise as part of the South Atlantic cooperation policy

Brazilian military thought does not rule out the return of conventional threats — more powerful states, driven by the exhaustion of natural resources to challenge sovereignty and jurisdiction over the Blue Amazon. They would not be South Atlantic countries, with which Brazil seeks close relations, but extraregional powers. The official stance as expressed by the Commander of the Navy and official documents such as the National Defense strategy is that the military presence of such powers in the South Atlantic is a reason for concern and any instrusion of conflicts and rivals external to the region must be disavowed.

A fishing dispute may escalate to an international crisis, as the Lobster War demonstrates. Other speculative pretexts for an intervention were published in the Marine Corps periodical Âncoras e Fuzis in 2016. The responsibility to protect could be invoked over environmental concerns. In an imagined 2030s scenario, the "United States of the World", the "Cohesive Kingdom" and other powers demand the interruption of pre-salt drilling after several oil spills. Oil platforms are attacked by sabotage and "countries tied to major oil production companies" "propose a shared management of the Pre-Salt and also of mineral resources already prospected in the Blue Amazon"; "several Brazilian Congressmen purportedly draft bills in this regard".

The South Atlantic security policy combines military re-equipment with South-South cooperation, in which Brazil stages joint naval exercises and provides military advisory and weapons to African countries, ultimately hoping to supersede their need to resort to extraregional powers. In the diplomatic sphere, Brazil participates in two regional organizations, the South Atlantic Peace and Cooperation Zone (ZOPACAS) and the Community of Portuguese Language Countries, but their activities are limited in scope. ZOPACAS is not a defensive military alliance and even if it were, its combined naval strength would be no match for extraregional powers. Brazil's benevolent but unilateral discourse may risk being taken for a hegemonic intention, and military re-equipment may arouse new competitions in the region.

In the case of a naval war, the extensive Brazilian coast eases power projection into the South Atlantic but in the same measure exposes the country to an enemy's power projection. The fleet's shortcomings and the economy's energy and trade reliance on the sea would be vulnerabilities. As of 2012, specialists agreed the country lacked the naval assets and surveillance and logistical infrastructure in sufficient quantity and technological level to deter potential threats. (Note: "Considering the low operational readiness of most of Brazil's ships and air fighters as well as absence of an effective joint operational structure (including expertise and command and control systems), it is not possible to consider Brazil having an effective sea denial posture in the next few years" (2015). "Not enough attention had been dedicated to reverse the context of decades of overlook of the oceans and the Brazilian Navy—unable to secure and protect the vastness of the Brazilian marine spaces" (2020).) The islands of Trindade and Fernando de Noronha have a potential defense and early warning capability, but it is not taken advantage of at present. Limited maritime domain awareness would delay any reaction from the fleet, which is concentrated in Rio de Janeiro.

==== Extraregional presence ====
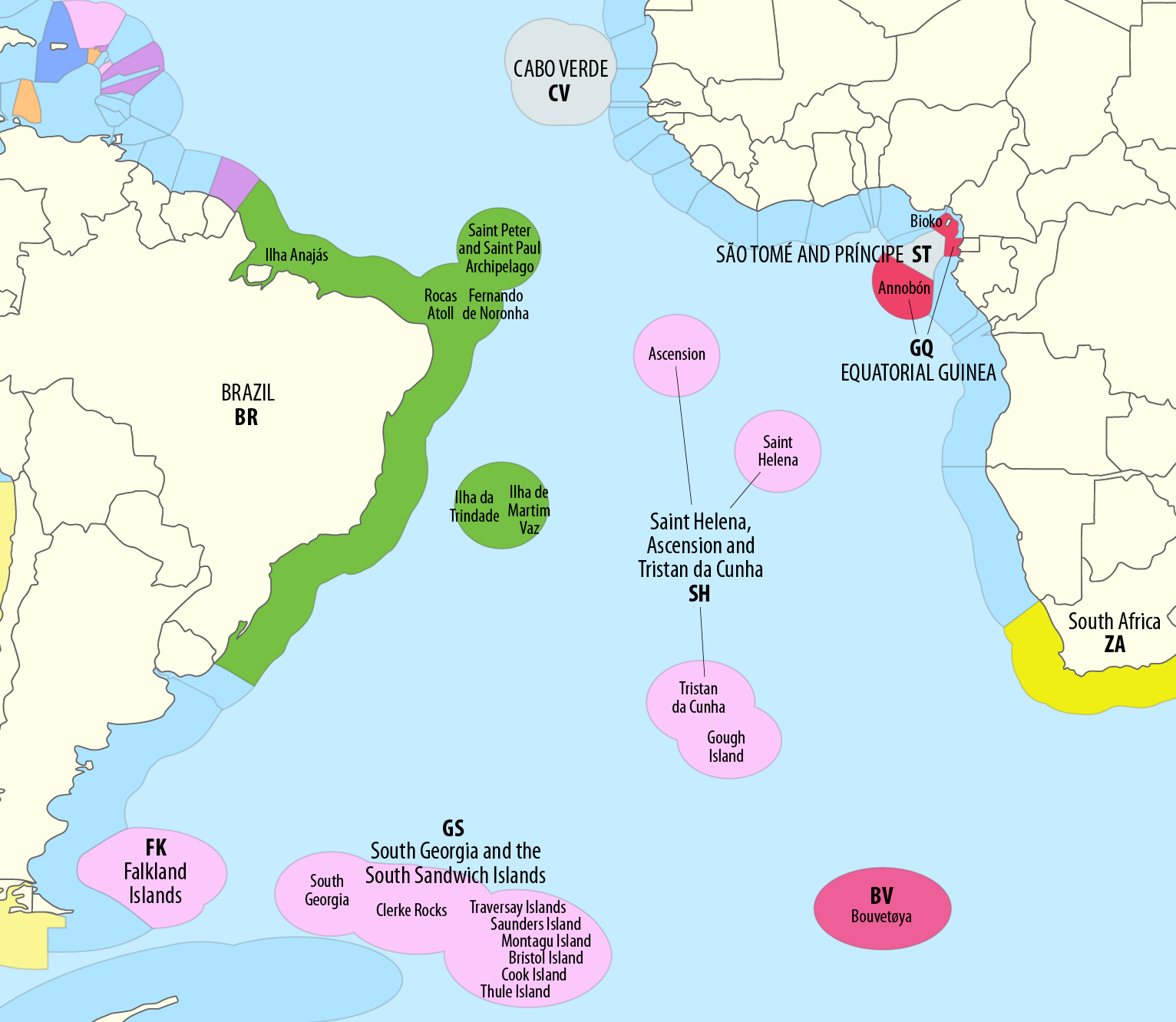
Exclusive economic zones in the South Atlantic

The military presence of extraregional powers in Brazil's strategic contour is a reality. The United States has its Southern and Africa Commands and bases in the islands of Curaçao and Ascension. The United Kingdom has a "string of pearls" of overseas territories: Ascension, Saint Helena, Tristan da Cunha and the Falklands, of which the first and the last have infrastructure to base naval ships and aircraft. France has troops in the Antilles, French Guiana and West Africa. The Netherlands has a small constabulary force in Curaçao. Russia has a military presence in Venezuela, but no bases. China has an increasing naval influence among African states, which may suggest declining Brazilian soft power in the region.

The US, UK, France and Netherlands are members of the North Atlantic Treaty Organization (NATO), which has conducted anti-piracy operations in the Gulf of Guinea. Out of those four, the first three are the most relevant, as they have the logistical capacity to project power into the South Atlantic. The British "string of pearls" bisects the ocean and its tips (Ascension and the Falklands) can be used as platforms to strangle access to the North Atlantic and Pacific or even attack the South American continent. Ascension was a key base in the 1982 Falklands War. Since this war, the three NATO powers have become hypothetical enemies in South American strategic imagination. President Luiz Inácio Lula da Silva suggested the United States Fourth Fleet's reactivation in 2008 was tied to Brazil's pre-salt oil discoveries. In 2013, Brazil's representative in the United Nations Security Council expressed concern over NATO's partnerships with South Atlantic states.

Unauthorized research vessels from extraregional powers have already appeared in Brazilian jurisdictional waters. In the late 2000s, some studies (mostly Russian and Chinese) in the extended continental shelf only came to the knowledge of Brazilian authorities when their results were published in scientific journals and congresses. In February 2020, the Russian Navy's intelligence ship Yantar, which is suspected of submarine cable espionage, entered the Brazilian EEZ. The Yantar disappeared from identification systems and was only found six days later, by a Navy helicopter and an Air Force plane, at 80 km from Rio de Janeiro, where it gave evasive answers as to its activities. It was forwarded to the Port of Rio de Janeiro, from where it left Brazilian waters under the Navy's surveillance. In April 2023 the German research vessel RV Maria S. Merian worked without authorization in the Rio Grande Rise. The frigate Independência (F-44) was dispatched to the area and the vessel sailed away.

== Government initiatives ==
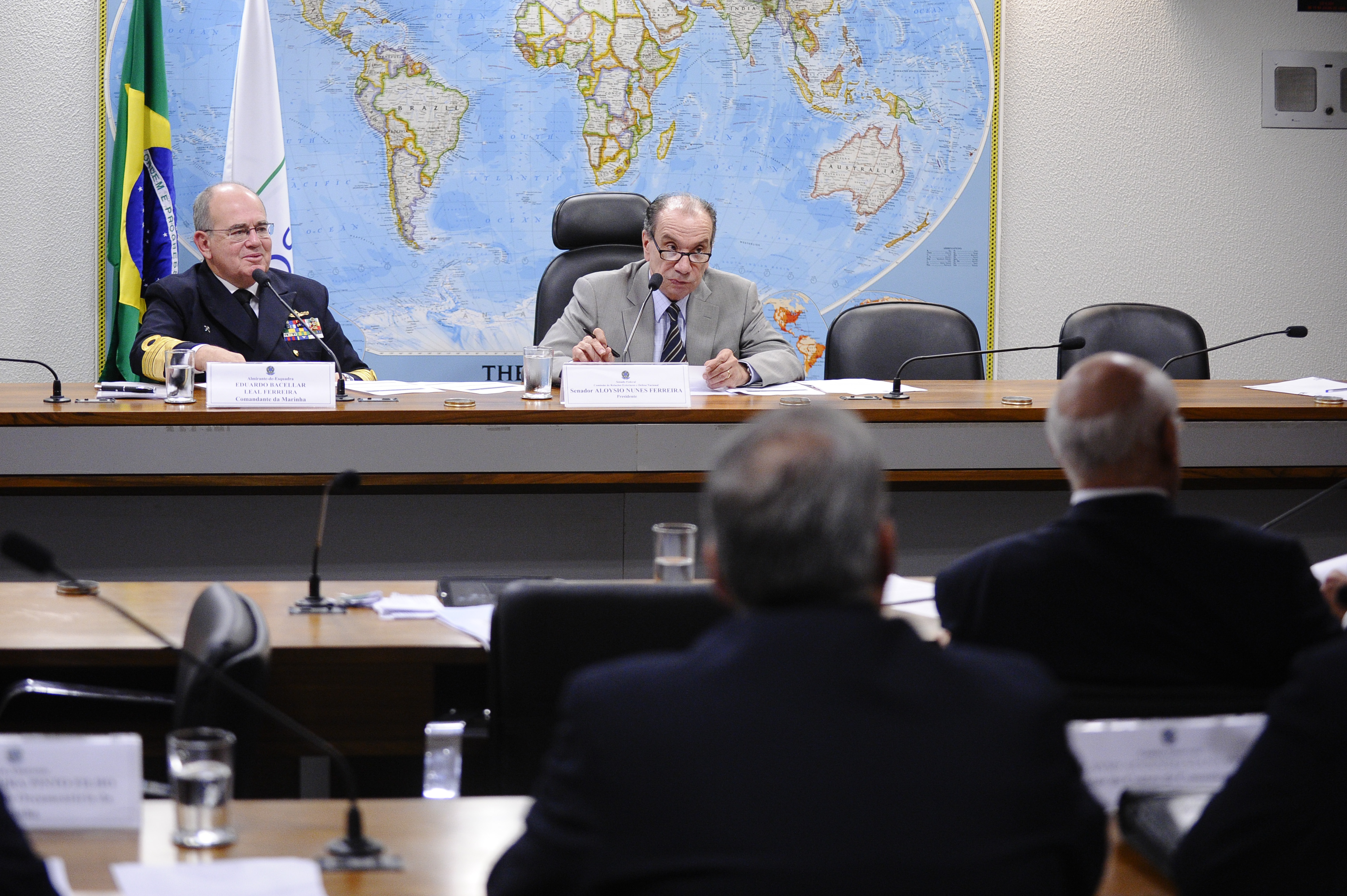
Eduardo Bacellar Leal Ferreira, commander of the Navy in 2015, presents his institution's strategic programmes to the Senate's Foreign Affairs and National Defense Commission

What can be called the "Brazilian oceanic strategy" has a decentralized execution governed by a mesh of policies, plans and actions — the National Marine Policy (Política Nacional do Mar PNM), National Marine Resource Policy (Política Nacional para os Recursos do Mar, PNRM) and the Sectorial Plans for Marine Resources (Planos Setoriais para os Recursos do Mar, PSRM) — coordinated by the Interministerial Commission for Marine Resources (Comissão Interministerial para os Recursos do Mar, CIRM). The CIRM is not an administrative entity. Its meetings are coordinated by a naval officer, who represents the Commander of the Navy and also heads its Secretariat, the SECIRM.

The PRNM is the framework for the quadrienal PSRMs, which are managed by ministries, financial agencies, private entities and the academic and scientific communities. From the beginning, the PSRMs focused on generating knowledge on the marine environment and training human resources. According to Alexandre Rocha Violante, professor of International Relations at the Naval War College, "Brazil is one of few developing states to have a strategic planning for the usage of oceanic space in its internal and external policy".

According to legal scholar Victor Alencar Ventura, this strategy is a decades-long process and has provided benefits to society, although a judgement is difficult to make, as some actions planned in the PSRMs have been successful, such as the LEPLAC and the Program for Evaluation of the Sustainable Potential of Living Resources in the Exclusive Economic Zone of Brazil (Programa de Avaliação do Potencial Sustentável de Recursos Vivos na Zona Econômica Exclusiva do Brasil, ReviZEE), while others were neglected. From his perspective, the oceanic strategy needs better coordination and continuity between programs. A lack of updates to the CIRM's website (as of December 2018) is for him a symptom of a lack of communication and dialogue, which compromises the ambition to build a "maritime mentality". By expanding its continental shelf, Brazil risks not having the institutional and legal conditions to manage the area.

=== Boundary expansion ===
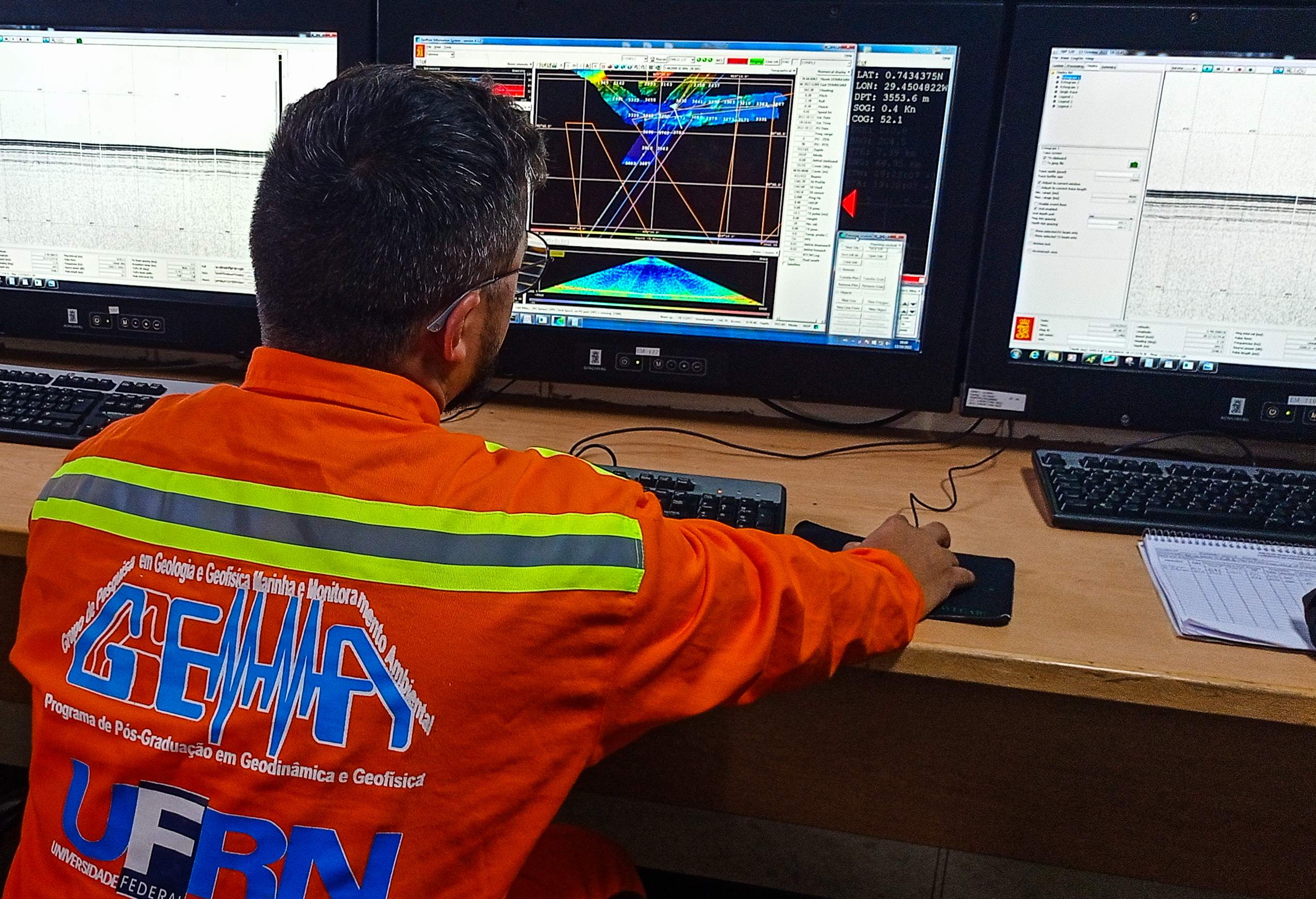
Federal University of Rio Grande do Norte researcher analyses a bathymetric survey obtained by the Vital de Oliveira

The delimitation of the continental shelf's outer boundary will outline the final shape of Brazilian maritime jurisdiction. This process is still incomplete and is the focus of much of the Blue Amazon's discourse. After the original proposal was delivered to the CLCS in 2004, American representatives in the United Nations questioned the scientific validity of the Brazilian document. The CLCS did not take this objection into account, as it was not allowed under the UNCLOS, but it did reject 21% of the Brazilian proposals. According to sources from the Ministry of Foreign Affairs, Petrobras lobbied for an immediate acceptance of the CLCS's counterproposal to secure parts of the pre-salt layer beyond the 200-nautical mile line. Entretanto, a decisão política foi de realizar novos levantamentos para revisar a proposta à CLPC.

The shelf's outer limits only become final and binding to other states when a final proposal accepted by the CLCS is deposited to the Secretary-General of the United Nations. This doesn't mean the extended shelf only exists after the CLCS's final decision; a coastal state has an inherent right to its shelf. When unauthorized research in the extended shelf came to light, in 2010 the CIRM declared that "regardless of the outer limit of the continental shelf beyond the 200 nautical miles not having been definitively established, Brazil has the right to evaluate in advance requests to conduct research in its continental shelf beyond 200 nmi". At the same time, a new phase of LEPLAC was ongoing. Brazil's strategic choice was to only deposit its limits to the Secretary-General after resolving all of its disagreements with the CLCS.

The revised proposal was submitted to the CLCS in three parts over 2015, 2017 and 2018 and more than doubled the area under claim, with the notable addition of the Rio Grande Rise, a mineral-rich undersea feature over 1,100 km from the Southeastern coast. This expansion territorializes the "Area", the stretch of seabed under international jurisdiction. In the CIRM's understanding, territorialization is an international tendency which Brazil cannot refrain from. Based on the revised proposals, one official source claimed in 2019 that Brazil "has the right to exploit and extensive ocen area, with around 5.7 million km²", while another stated more carefully that "our Blue Amazon will have an area of around 5.7 million km²". As of 2024, only the proposal for the southern continental margin had been approved by the CLCS, and the rest was still on hold. A coastal state may present revisions to the CLCS as many times as it wants, at the risk of finding itself stuck in an endless cycle of proposals and counterproposals.

=== Scientific research ===
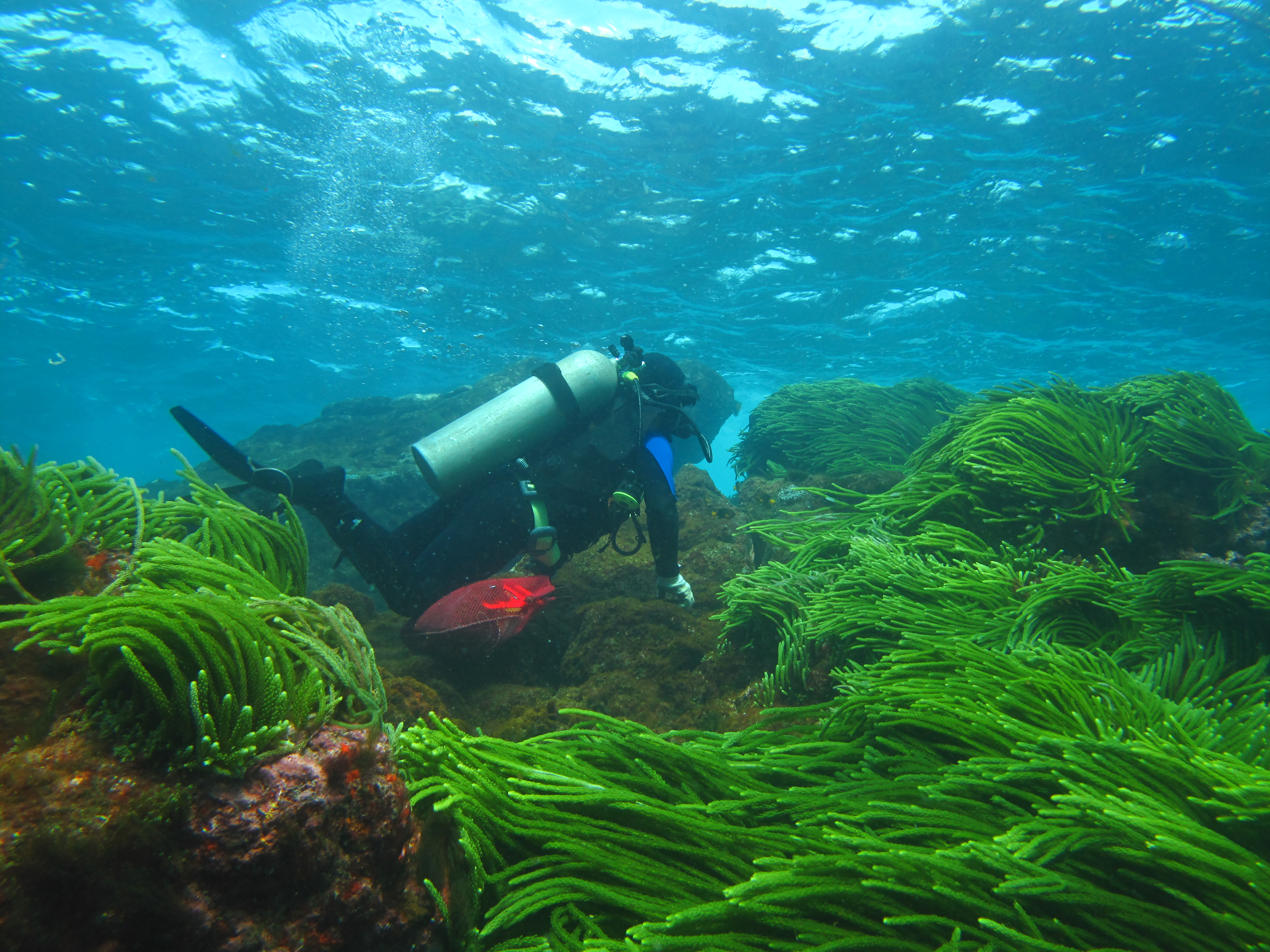
Benthic survey diving in Arraial do Cabo, Rio de Janeiro

The PSRM provides for multiple research programs in the South Atlantic to substantiate continental shelf extension proposals, ensure national presence in oceanic islands and understand the area's marine life and natural resources. The Blue Amazon's scientific facet, as explained by the Navy, is directly tied to sovereignty and social and economic benefits from marine resources. One of the PSRM's actions has the explicit objective of securing rights to parts of the EEZ: the Island Scientific Research program (Pesquisas Científicas nas Ilhas, Proilhas), which is coordinated by the Navy and charged with maintaining a permanent occupation in the archipelagos of Trindade and Martin Vaz and Saint Peter and Saint Paul.

According to the UNCLOS, islands project their own EEZ and continental shelf, but not rocks which cannot sustain human habitation or economic life of their own. Trindade has a population of 36, which is the garrison of an oceanographic outpost staffed by the Navy since 1957. Its scientific program, the Protrindade, was established in 2007 to organize the transport of researchers to the island. It has drinking water sources, but access to its rocky coast can only be done with small boats or helicopters.

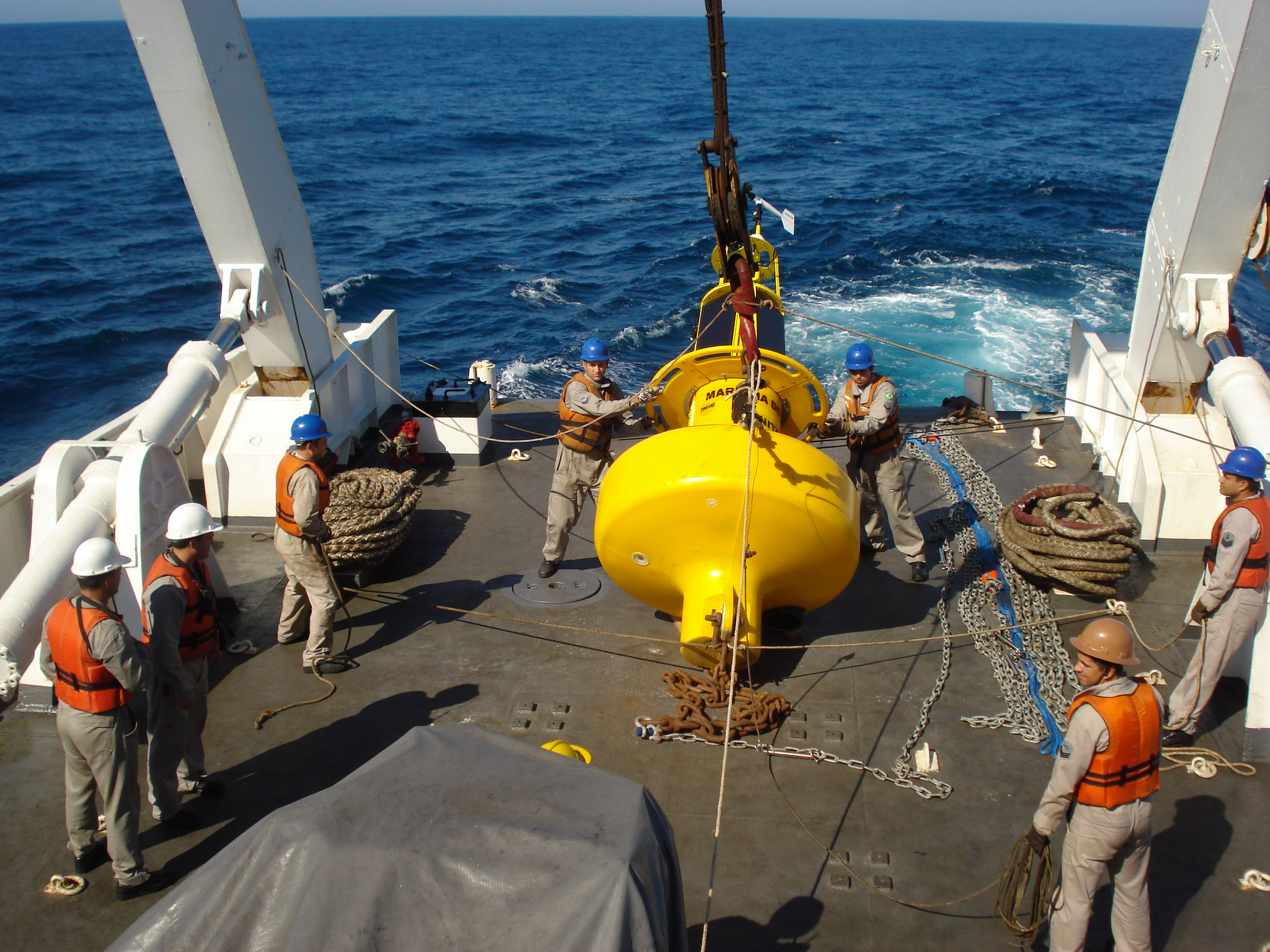
Retrieval of a buoy by the hydro-oceanographic research vessel Amorim do Valle (H-35)

Saint Peter and Saint Paul is settled by four researchers and military personnel. The Brazilian government's understanding is that a permanent human presence is enough for island status, regardless of the population's biweekly rotation and difficult survival. A naval ship must be constantly kept in the outpost's vicinity and the archipelago has no soil or drinking water and is exposed to seismic events and harsh weather conditions. It is of biological interest as an isolated point midway between South America and Africa and geological interest for its non-volcanic origin — an above-water portion of the Mid-Atlantic Ridge made of exposed mantle rocks. Nonetheless, human settlement was installed in the 1990s with the clear objective of expanding the EEZ. The Navy argued in the CIRM with the precedents of Rockall, Okinotorishima, Clipperton, Jan Mayen e Aves and the Ministry of Foreign Relations was favorable, but voiced concerns that other states could challenge the claim, but this has not happened.

The Navy also coordinates the Brazilian Ocean Observing and Climate Study System (GOOS-Brasil), which operates a network of oceanographic and weather buoys, and the Development and Sustainable Usage of the Blue Amazon program (Pro Amazônia Azul). The Ministry of the Environment coordinates the Evaluation, Monitoring and Conservation of Marine Biodiversity (Revimar), a survey of the productive potential of living resources, which succeeds the earlier ReviZEE program. Together with the SECIRM, it organizes the Marine Spatial Planning (PEM) program. Juntamente com a Secretaria da CIRM, organiza o programa de Planejamento Espacial Marinho (PEM). The Ministry of Mines and Energy oversees the Evaluation of the Brazilian Legal Continental Shelf's Mineral Potential (REMPLAC) program, the Ministry of Science, Technology and Innovation, the Marine Biotechnology (Biotecmarinha) program, and the Ministry of Education, the Formation of Human Resources in Marine Sciences (PPG-Mar) program.

=== Publicization ===
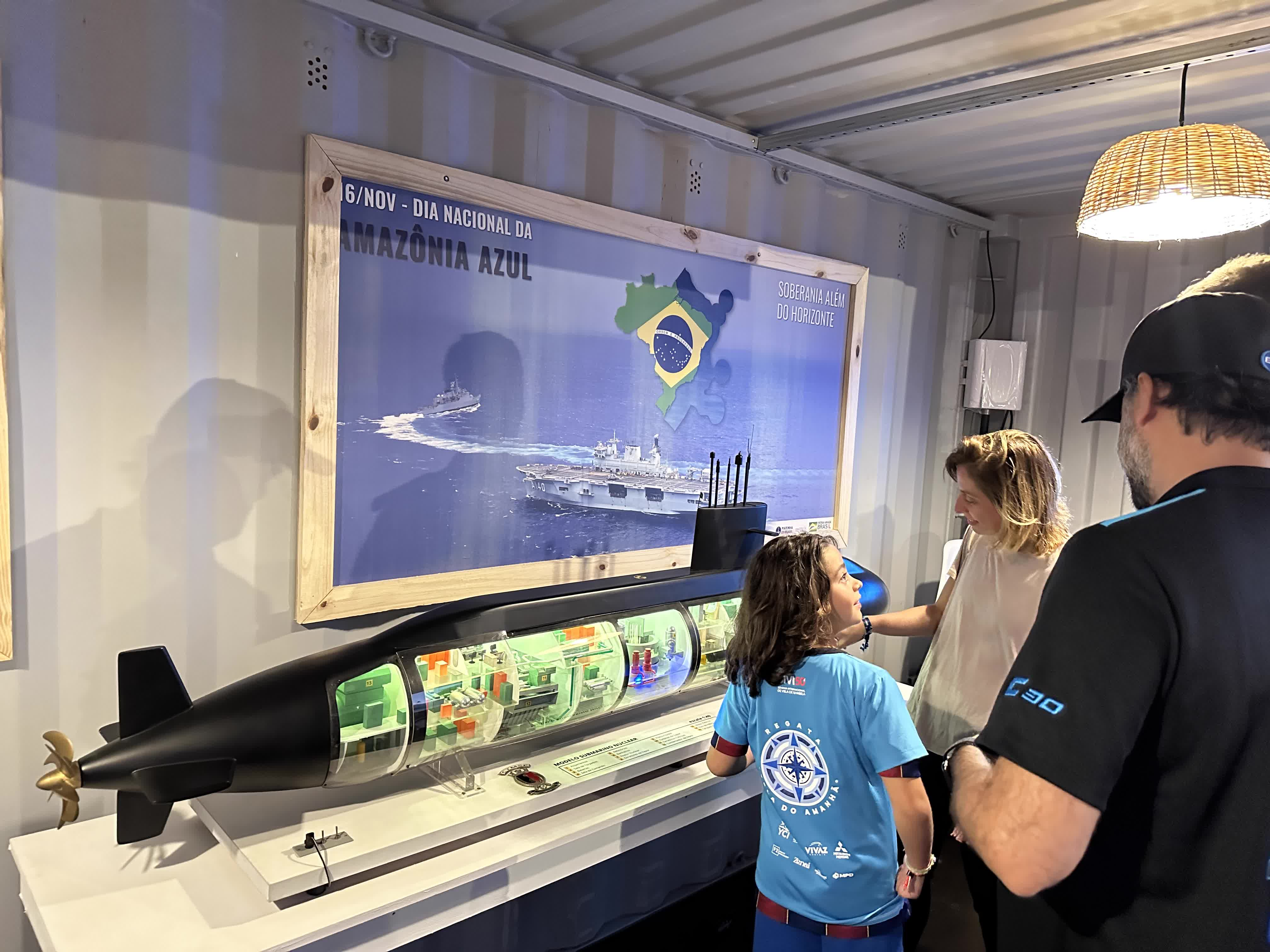
Exhibition on the National Blue Amazon Day and a model of the future nuclear submarine at the Ilhabela Sailing Week

Communication of Blue Amazon-related themes is part of the PSRM through its Promotion of Maritime Mentality (Promar) program. Its intended audience consists officially of "members of the federal, state and municipal powers; policy- and decision-makers; the scientific community and civil service; professors and students of the country; communicators and opinion-makers; and the population in general and the youth in particular". A focus on the youth reveals long-term ambitions. The Promar has invested in printed material (including schoolbooks through a partnership between the Navy and the Ministry of Education), institutional videos, writing contests, lectures in schools, universities and scientific seminars, traveling exhibitions and other publicity methods.

Soon after admiral Carvalho published his opinion column in the Folha de São Paulo, in 2004, the topic was covered by televised reports and Roberto Godoy's articles in the Estado de São Paulo. However, Roberto Lopes concluded a decade later that the Navy did not achieve its desired impact in public opinion. The topic was largely ignored by indepenndet media and found no sufficiently credible spokespeople in the Rio de Janeiro-São Paulo-Belo Horizonte-Brasília axis. The Blue Amazon's meaning was not obvious to all and had to be explained to its audience or else it could be mistaken for a naval initiative in the Green Amazon. Furthermore, the "emphasis naval chiefs have placed to the enormous dimensions of the maritime area under Brazil's responsibility seemed perfectly clear and understood", but what was missing was "an element of persuasion regarding the threat that loomed over it".

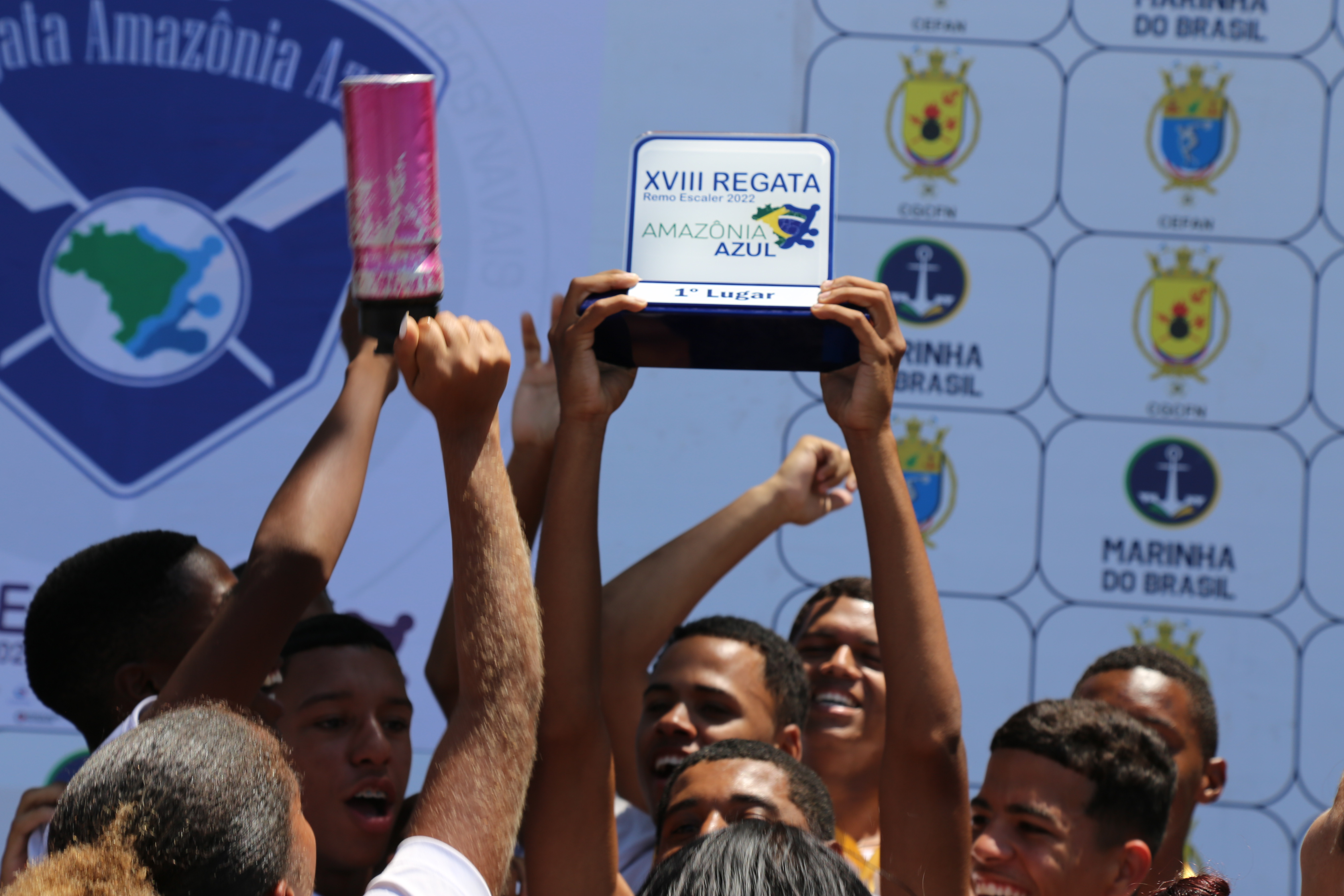
Award ceremony for a sports competition named after the Blue Amazon

A public enterprise founded in 2012 to contribute to the Submarine Development Program was named Amazônia Azul Tecnologias de Defesa S.A., also known as Amazul. The 1st International Forum on Bay Management, held in Salvador in 2014, declared Todos os Santos Bay as the capital of the Blue Amazon. In 2015 Congress designated November 16, the date UNCLOS came into force in 1994, as "National Blue Amazon Day".

At first the borders of the Blue Amazon and even its archipelagos were not marked in Brazilian atlases. Starting on 2023–2024, several broadcasters such as Record, Correio Braziliense, Empresa Brasil de Comunicação, Band, CNN Brasil, Rede TV and Jovem Pan included maps with the Blue Amazon in their schedule. Several of them shade the area in their weather forecast maps. The 2024 School Atlas published by the Brazilian Institute of Geography and Statistics (Instituto Brasileiro de Geografia e Estatística, IBGE) included the "new eastern limit of Brazil's coastal-marine system". This change was publicized in seminars held on coastal states.

Despite all of these efforts, only 6% of the public understood the concept of the Blue Amazon and another 18% had heard of it by 2014, according to an opinion poll commissioned by the Navy Command to the Getúlio Vargas Foundation. Some sources describe the Navy as having successfully relayed the concept to the public, a "successful narrative" which "has leveraged the Navy to the spotlight of domestic political debates". An analyst at the Tecnologia & Defesa periodical still complained of a "weak maritime mentality" in the public in 2023.

=== Military re-equipment ===
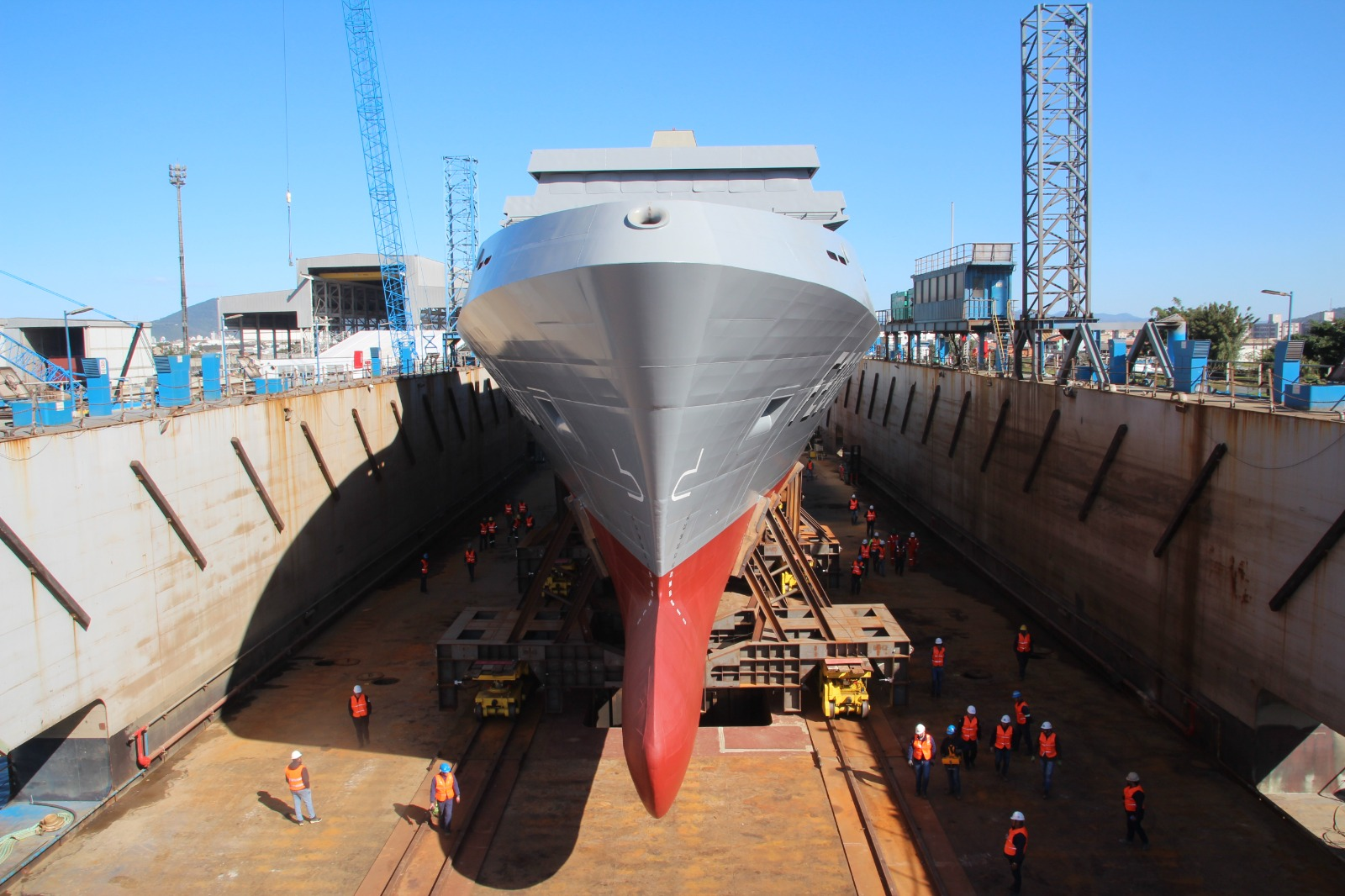
Frigate Tamandaré (F-200) at the Brasil Sul Shipyard

In the 2000s, the discovery of new oil and gas reserves, economic growth and new high-level defense documents such as the National Defense Strategy (END) allowed the Navy to devise new investment programs, which have been framed as needed for the defense of the Blue Amazon. The END calls for the Armed Forces to have adequate assets — satellites, land-based and naval aviation and a balanced fleet of submarines and surface combatants — to surveil jurisdictional waters, deter hostile forces and deny. Pre-salt discoveries politically justified increased defense spending, and the Navy stood directly to gain, as it is legally entitled to some of the royalties of oil revenue.

The ambitious 2009 Navy Articulation and Equipment Plan (Plano de Articulação e Equipamento da Marinha, PAEMB) promised a fleet worthy of an international power by the 2030s: two 50-thousand ton aircraft carriers, six nuclear-powered and 15 conventionally-powered submarines, four amphibious assault ships, 30 main surface combatants and additional auxiliary and patrol vessels. They would be complemented by the Blue Amazon Management System (Sistema de Gerenciamento da Amazônia Azul, SisGAAz), a network of satellites, radar stations and underwater sensors to monitor jurisdictional waters.

The PAEMB fell short of budgetary realities and as the economic situation worsened, it was dropped in its original format. As of 2016, the SisGAAz no longer had an official conclusion date. From 2000 to 2022 the fleet decommissioned two aircraft carriers, a tanker, three amphibious assault ships, three submarines, three minesweepers and eleven escort ships. In the same period it commissioned a helicopter carrier, an amphibious assault ship, an escort and two submarines. Four escorts and three submarines were under construction, but a further 40% of the fleet was to be decommissioned until 2028. By 2023, most of the surface fleet was nearing 40 years of age and faced the prospect of block obsolescence. The Seaforth World Naval Review speculated that "unless the political will can be found to increase its resources, the Brazilian Navy will be left with a capacity far below its responsibilities".

== Comparable terms ==
The idea of combining a national biome with the sea was repeated in the Argentine project of the "Blue Pampa" (Spanish: Pampa Azul), announced in 2014. Like the Blue Amazon, the Blue Pampa was devised to become a state policy bringing together multiple ministries, scientific and military aspects and surveys of the extended continental shelf. The Army's Antártica Verde ("Green Antarctica"), a program to allow researchers into military lands in the Amazon, was named as a light-hearted tease at the Navy's Blue Amazon and Antarctic Program.

== References and notes ==
=== Sources ===
- Abdenur, Adriana Erthal; Souza Neto, Danilo Marcondes de (November 2013). "Brazil's maritime strategy in the South Atlantic: the nexus between security and resources" (PDF). South African Institute of International Affairs (SAIIA) Occasional Paper (161).
- Andrade, Fábio da Silva (2009). O petróleo do pré-sal brasileiro: do direito de jurisdição as possíveis perspectivas de ameaças a soberania nacional (PDF) (Monograph). Escola de Guerra Naval.
- Andrade, Israel de Oliveira; Franco, Luiz Gustavo Aversa (2018). "A Amazônia Azul como fronteira marítima do Brasil: importância estratégica e imperativos para a Defesa Nacional" (PDF). In Bolívar Pêgo (coord.) (ed.). Fronteiras do Brasil: uma avaliação de política pública, volume 1. Rio de Janeiro: Instituto de Pesquisa Econômica Aplicada. ISBN 978-85-7811-337-7.
- Andrade, Israel de Oliveira; et al. (February 2022). "PIB do mar brasileiro, motivações sociais, econômicas e ambientais para sua mensuração e seu monitoramento" (PDF). Texto para discussão (2740). Brasília/Rio de Janeiro: Instituto de Pesquisa Econômica Aplicada. doi:10.38116/td2740.
- Assumpção, Alexander Neves de (2018). Interpretações sobre as áreas de Jurisdição a partir da Costa: O conceito de Águas Jurisdicionais Brasileiras comparado a conceitos Análogos do Chile e Argentina (PDF) (Monograph). Escola de Guerra Naval.
- Carvalho, Gustavo de Lemos Campos (June 1999). "O mar territorial brasileiro de 200 milhas: estratégia e soberania, 1970-1982". Revista Brasileira de Política Internacional. 42 (1). Centro de Estudos Globais da Universidade de Brasília: 110–126. doi:10.1590/S0034-73291999000100005.
- Carvalho, Andréa Bento (2018). Economia do mar: conceito, valor e importância para o Brasil (PDF) (Thesis). Programa de Pós-Graduação em Economia do Desenvolvimento da Pontifícia Universidade Católica do Rio Grande do Sul.
- Carvalho, Vinícius Mariano de (2022). "Beyond the Blue Amazon: the Brazilian vocation to the South Atlantic". Power and the Maritime Domain. Routledge. ISBN 978-1-003-29898-4.
- Castro, Belmiro M.; et al. (2017). "A Amazônia Azul: recursos e preservação". Revista USP (113): 7–26. doi:10.11606/issn.2316-9036.v0i113p7-26. Archived from the original on 2018-07-19.
- CEMBRA (2022). O Brasil e o mar no século XXI: Relatório aos tomadores de decisão do país (3rd ed.). Niterói: Centro de Excelência para o Mar Brasileiro. ISBN 978-65-991881-2-1.
- Costa, Wanderley Messias da (September–November 2012). "Projeção do Brasil no Atlântico Sul: geopolítica e estratégia". Revista USP (95): 9–22. doi:10.11606/issn.2316-9036.v0i95p9-22. Archived from the original on 2019-04-30.
- Costa, José Augusto Fontoura (2017). "A Amazônia Azul e o domínio marítimo brasileiro". Revista USP (113): 27–44. doi:10.11606/issn.2316-9036.v0i113p27-44. Archived from the original on 2018-07-22.
- Duarte, Érico (2016). "Brazil, the Blue Economy and the maritime security of the South Atlantic". Journal of the Indian Ocean Region. 12 (1): 97–111. doi:10.1080/19480881.2015.1067384.
- Figueirôa, Christiano Sávio Barros (2014). Limites exteriores da plataforma continental do Brasil conforme o direito do mar (PDF). Brasília: FUNAG. ISBN 978-85-7631-523-0. Archived from the original (PDF) on 2015-06-01.
- Freitas, Wilmar Terroso (2008). A aviação de patrulha e a defesa dos interesses brasileiros na Amazônia azul: uma reflexão (Dissertation). Programa de Pós-Graduação em Ciências Aeroespaciais da Universidade da Força Aérea.
- Herz, Mônica; Dawood, Layla; Lage, Victor Coutinho (May–August 2017). "A nuclear submarine in the South Atlantic: the framing of threats and deterrence". Contexto Internacional. 39 (2): 329–350. doi:10.1590/s0102-8529.2017390200007.
- Kilian Junior, Rudibert (2016). "Cenários prospectivos para a Amazônia Azul". Âncoras e Fuzis (47). Mangaratiba: Comando do Desenvolvimento Doutrinário do Corpo de Fuzileiros Navais: 20–23.
- Lopes, Roberto (2014). As garras do cisne: o ambicioso plano da Marinha brasileira de se transformar na nona frota mais poderosa do mundo. Rio de Janeiro: Record. ISBN 978-85-01-10276-8.
- Maia, Felipe Malachini (2020). O Brasil no Mar: um panorama sobre as potenciais ameaças ao seu entorno estratégico e à Amazônia Azul (PDF) (Dissertation). Escola de Guerra Naval.
- Marques, Adriana Aparecida (2007). Amazônia: pensamento e presença militar (PDF) (Thesis). Departamento de Ciência Política da Faculdade de Filosofia e Ciências Humanas da Universidade de São Paulo.
- Marques, Cassiano (2020). Navios fantasmas na Amazônia Azul: controle e mitigação (PDF) (Monograph). Escola Superior de Guerra.
- Marreiro, Matheus Moraes Alves (2021). As representações espaciais e a geopolítica popular no Brasil: o Atlântico Sul como uma geografia imaginativa (PDF) (Dissertation). Programa de Pós-Graduação em Segurança Internacional e Defesa da Escola Superior de Guerra.
- Mendes, Andrea Ribeiro (2006). A Constituição das fronteiras marítimas brasileiras: do "Mar Territorial" à "Amazônia Azul" (PDF) (Dissertation). Escola Nacional de Ciências Estatísticas.
- Miloslavich, Patricia; et al. (2011). "Marine biodiversity in the Atlantic and Pacific coasts of South America: knowledge and gaps". PLOS ONE. 6 (1) e14631. Bibcode:2011PLoSO...614631M. doi:10.1371/journal.pone.0014631. PMC 3031619. PMID 21304960.
- Moreira, Alexandre Santana (January–April 2017). "As ameaças sobre a Amazônia Verde e Amazônia Azul: uma relação possível?". Revista da Escola de Guerra Naval. 23 (1): 239–274. doi:10.22491/1809-3191.v23n1.p239-274.
- Salles, Felipe; Galante, Alexandre (2023). "The Brazilian Navy entering its third century". In Conrad Waters (ed.). Seaforth World Naval Review 2024. Pen & Sword. ISBN 978-1-3990-2312-2.
- Serafim, Carlos Frederico Simões (2007). "REVIZEE - missão cumprida?". Revista Brasileira de Engenharia de Pesca. 2 (1). Archived from the original on 2024-09-06.
- Silva, Alexandre Pereira da (2017). "Brazil's recent agenda on the sea and the South Atlantic contemporary scenario". Marine Policy. 85 (85): 25–32. Bibcode:2017MarPo..85...25D. doi:10.1016/j.marpol.2017.08.010.
- Silva, Alexandre Pereira da (2019). "Brazilian large-scale marine protected areas: Other "paper parks"?". Ocean and Coastal Management. 169 (169): 104–112. Bibcode:2019OCM...169..104P. doi:10.1016/j.ocecoaman.2018.12.012.
- Silva, Alexandre Pereira da (2020a). "The concept of Brazilian Jurisdictional Waters and its impact on the freedom of the high seas". The International Journal of Marine and Coastal Law. 35 (2): 295–324. doi:10.1163/15718085-12341003.
- Silva, Alexandre Pereira da (2020b). "From rocks to an archipelago: the Brazilian interpretation and application of Article 121 of the United Nations Convention on the Law of the Sea with respect to the St. Peter and St. Paul insular features". Ocean Development & International Law. 51 (4): 330–357. doi:10.1080/00908320.2020.1820153.
- Silva, Alexandre Pereira da (2021). "Brazil advances over the Area: The inclusion of the Rio Grande Rise within the Brazilian outer continental shelf and its consequences for other states and for the common heritage of mankind". Marine Policy. 125. Bibcode:2021MarPo.12504399P. doi:10.1016/j.marpol.2021.104399.
- Souza, Jairo M. de (March 1999). "Mar territorial, zona econômica exclusiva ou plataforma continental?". Revista Brasileira de Geofísica. 17: 79–82. doi:10.1590/S0102-261X1999000100007. ISSN 0102-261X.
- Sumida, Paulo Yukio Gomes; Bernardino, Angelo Fraga; De Léo, Fabio Cabrera (2020). Brazilian deep-sea biodiversity. Springer. ISBN 978-3-030-53222-2.
- Taylor, Paul D. (June 2009). "Why does Brazil need nuclear submarines?". Proceedings. 135/6/1276. U.S. Naval Institute. Archived from the original on 2024-02-23.
- Terra, Ana Carolina Dias (2022). A "hegemonia consensual" na política externa brasileira: um olhar sobre a ZOPACAS e a Elevação do Rio Grande (PDF) (Dissertation). Escola de Guerra Naval.
- Ventura, Victor Alencar Mayer Feitosa (2020). Environmental Jurisdiction in the Law of the Sea: the Brazilian Blue Amazon. Springer. ISBN 978-3-030-50543-1.
- Violante, Alexandre Rocha (2022). "Amazônia Azul". In Silva, Francisco Carlos Teixeira da (org.) (ed.). Dicionário de história militar do Brasil (1822-2022): volume I. Rio de Janeiro: Autografia. ISBN 978-85-518-4909-5.
- Wiesebron, Marianne (January–June 2013). "Amazônia Azul: pensando a defesa do território marítimo brasileiro". Austral: Revista Brasileira de Estratégia e Relações Internacionais. 2 (3): 107–131. doi:10.22456/2238-6912.35039. ISSN 2238-6262.
- Zanella, Tiago V. (2018). "Águas Jurisdicionais Brasileiras: um estudo sobre a (i)legalidade do conceito de AJB" (PDF). Revista Jurídica Luso-Brasileira (6). Lisboa: Centro de Investigação de Direito Privado.
- Zirker, Daniel Gates (2015). "Um olhar estrangeiro sobre segurança e securitização na Amazônia". Revista Política Hoje. 24 (1). Universidade Federal de Pernambuco.
