= Brazilian ship Riachuelo =

Seven ships of the Brazilian Navy have been named Riachuelo after the main naval battle fought by the Empire of Brazil in the Paraguayan War.

- Brazilian yacht Riachuelo
- Brazilian steamboat Riachuelo, later renamed Marquês de Caxias.
- Brazilian flat-bottomed boat Riachuelo
- Brazilian battleship Riachuelo, of the Imperial Brazilian Navy. (1883–1910)
- Brazilian battleship Riachuelo (1914), cancelled project. (1914)
- Brazilian submarine Riachuelo (S15), a Gato-class submarine, used in World War II by the U.S. Navy, before being incorporated into the Brazilian Navy. (1943–1968)
- Brazilian submarine Riachuelo (S22), an Oberon-class submarine, currently serving as a museum. (1977–1997)
- Brazilian submarine Riachuelo (S40), a Riachuelo-class submarine. (2018–present)
