= Brazilian submarine Tonelero =

Brazilian submarine Tonelero may refer to the following submarines of the Brazilian Navy:

- Brazilian submarine Tonelero (S21), an Oberon-class submarine
- Brazilian submarine Tonelero (S42), a Riachuelo-class submarine

== See also ==
- Tonelero (disambiguation)
