= Thadeu Marcos Orosco Coelho Lobo =

Commander of the Brazilian Navy

Admiral Thadeu Marcos Orosco Coelho Lobo
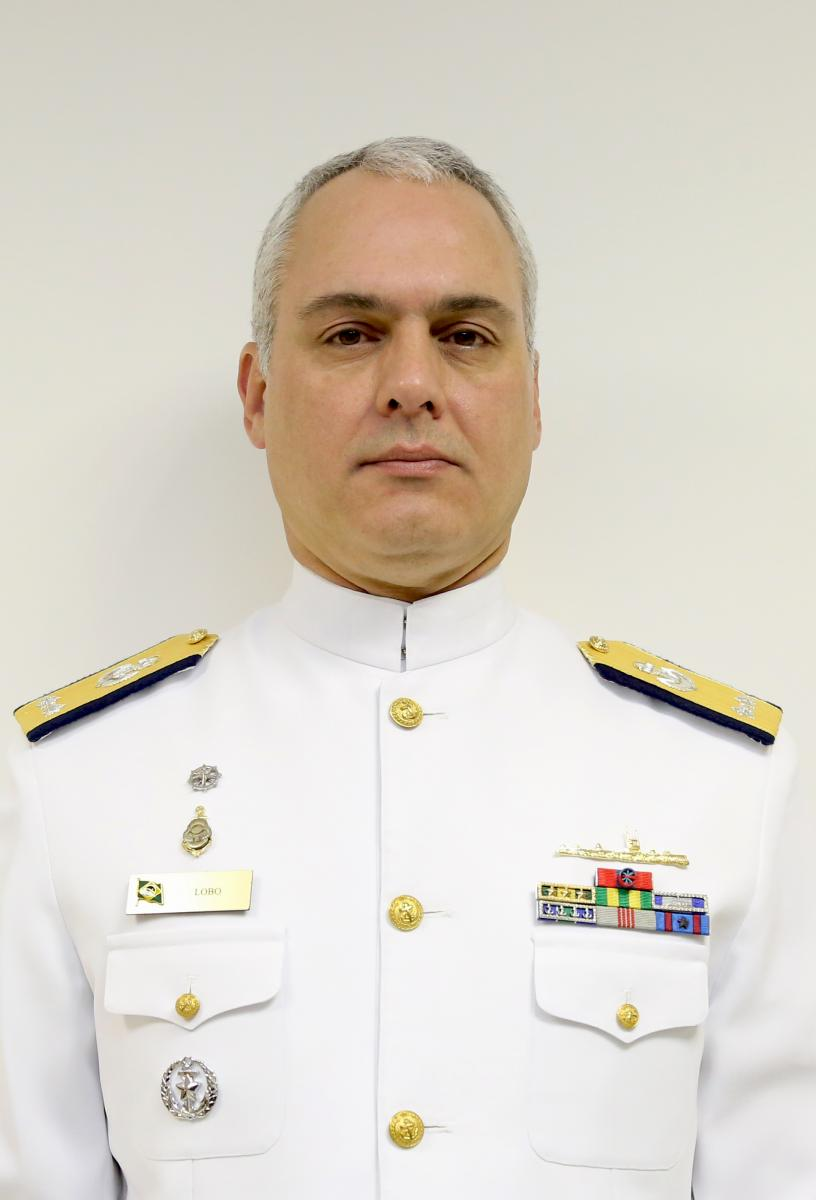

Commander of the Brazilian Submarine Force
- Incumbent
- Assumed office 16 December 2019
- President: Jair Bolsonaro
- Minister of Defence: Fernando Azevedo e Silva
- Navy Commander: Ilques Barbosa Junior
- Preceded by: Luiz Carlos Roças Corrêa

Personal details
- Born: Rio de Janeiro, Brazil

Military service
- Allegiance: Brazil
- Branch/service: Brazilian Navy
- Years of service: 1989−present
- Rank: Rear Admiral

Thadeu Marcos Orosco Coelho Lobo (born in Rio de Janeiro) is a Brazilian Rear Admiral, and current Commander of the Brazilian Submarine Force (ComForS) and as of 16 December 2019, he replaced Luiz Carlos Roças Corrêa in the Command of the ComForS.

Military offices
Preceded by Luiz Carlos Roças Corrêa	Commander of the Brazilian Submarine Force; 2019–present	Incumbent
