= Brazilian Submarine Force =

Submarine force of the Brazilian Navy

- Força de Submarinos
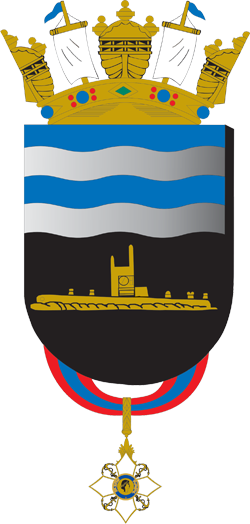
- Seal
- Active: since 17 July 1914; 111 years ago
- Country: Brazil
- Branch: Brazilian Navy
- Type: Submarines
- Part of: Brazilian Navy
- Command HQ: Itaguaí, Rio de Janeiro
- Engagements: World War I World War II
- Website: www.marinha.mil.br/comfors/

Commanders
- Commander-in-Chief: President Lula da Silva
- Navy Commander: Marcos Sampaio Olsen
- Colonel of the Regiment: Humberto Carmo

The Submarine Force (Portuguese: Força de Submarinos; ForSub) of the Brazilian Navy is the component of the Fleet that organizes these assets and their naval bases, auxiliary vessels, training schools, and divers. Its operational components comprise four submarines, one rescue ship, one aviso, and a special operations unit, the Combat Divers Group. Its main anchorage and command headquarters is Madeira Island, in Itaguaí, with additional facilities on Mocanguê Grande Island, in Niterói–both in the state of Rio de Janeiro.

Brazil has operated submarines since 1914, beginning with the Foca class. Historically, there has been an average of four to five submarines in service, with a peak of ten in 1977–1978. They were built abroad until the 1980s, when Brazilian industry became the first in the Southern Hemisphere to assemble submarines. The technological source shifted from Italy to the United States, the United Kingdom, Germany, and currently France. From the Second World War to the early Cold War, during the Italian and American phases, priority was given to training surface forces in anti-submarine warfare.

From the 1970s onward, Navy strategists rethought submarines as elements of a balanced blue-water fleet and/or as instruments for sea denial in a defensive campaign off the coast. The 2008 National Defense Strategy confirmed their priority on the Navy's agenda, and since then the Submarine Development Program (ProSub) has aimed to build a mixed fleet of conventionally armed submarines with conventional (diesel-electric) propulsion and nuclear propulsion in Brazil. (Note: Regarding ProSub and the role of submarines in general, see Andrade et al. (2018), Assis (2020), Kassenova (2014), Lobo (2007), Maciel (2019), Martins (2011), Martins (2014), Moura (2012), Moura (2022), Moura (2023), Sá (2015), Scott (2019), Souza (2020), and Taylor (2009).) The conventional submarines–the only type currently in service–are more suitable for positional warfare. The future Brazilian nuclear-powered submarine will be a complementary platform with greater autonomy and mobility, officially intended for deterrence and the patrol of jurisdictional waters.

Brazilian submariners are volunteers trained at the Admiral Áttila Monteiro Aché Training and Instruction Center (CIAMA). The career of a submarine crew member is prestigious, highly specialized, and psychologically demanding. The working environment is isolated, confined, artificial, and has its own culture. (Note: Regarding submariners and their working conditions, see Briggs (2011), Dias (2023), Herkenkoff (2008), Mazzacaro (2014), Menkes (2012), Moura & Baptista (2018), and Themudo & Viana (2023).) Risks are constant. The largest accident in ForSub's history was the sinking of Tonelero (S-21) at the pier in 2000, but there were no fatalities or injuries.

== Origins ==
In the 1890s, Lieutenant Felinto Perry campaigned in the press for the acquisition of submersibles. Other naval officers, such as Luís de Mello Marques, Luís Jacinto Gomes, and Emílio Júlio Hess, presented designs for such vessels, but none received funding for construction. Only after the purchase of Italian Foca-class submarines did the Brazilian Navy activate the "Submersible Flotilla" on 17 July 1914, under the command of Officer Perry–by then a frigate captain. This organization was the forerunner of today's Submarine Force. In 1928, it changed its designation to Submarine Flotilla; it was disbanded in 1933, reestablished in 1937, and renamed under its current designation in 1963. Its headquarters were located on Mocanguê Grande Island, in Niterói, from its creation until 2021, when it was transferred to its current base in Itaguaí.

== Doctrine and missions ==
In the early years of the 20th century, the role to be assigned to submersibles was unclear and tended to be defensive. The first Brazilian submersibles lacked the range, size, and armament to contribute much beyond port defense. The very terminology–submersible rather than submarine–evokes the technological difference from modern vessels, although there is no consensus on the moment or characteristics that distinguish one from the other, and not every language makes this distinction.

In 21st-century naval doctrine, the submarine is an offensive weapon, albeit one embedded within a national defensive strategy. It is "the only warship capable of operating independently, for long periods, in seas dominated by the enemy". Less dependent on logistical support and weather conditions than surface ships, it can operate alone and from the outset of hostilities. Its stealth and three-dimensional mobility allow it to strike with the advantage of surprise and inflict damage disproportionate to its own cost, although it can withstand little damage if hit. Its usual weapons–missiles and torpedoes–do not allow the destructive power to be finely calibrated to circumstances, and its very presence in a crisis area by itself exacerbates tensions. From the standpoint of international law, submarines face difficulties in rescuing shipwreck survivors and in target identification.

=== Anti-submarine warfare ===
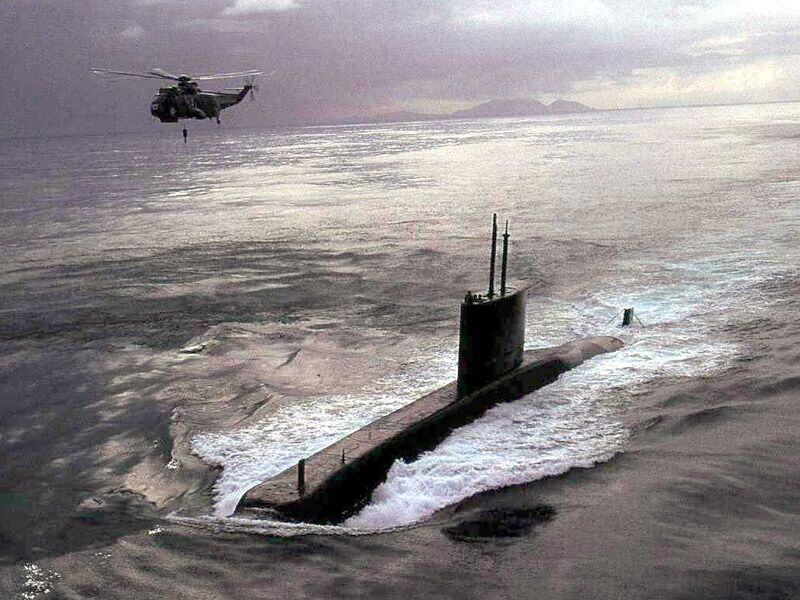
A Tupi class submarine with a Sea King aircraft from the 1st Anti-Submarine Helicopter Squadron

In both World Wars (1914–1918 and 1939–1945), submarines found a niche in commerce raiding, sinking merchant ships to choke the enemy's maritime lines of communication. Attacks by German U-boats on the Brazilian merchant marine were the immediate causes of Brazil's entry into both World Wars. In the following decades, the Brazilian Navy worked with the hypothesis of a Third World War involving Soviet submarine attacks against maritime traffic. From its participation in the Second World War through the 1970s, Brazil adhered to the logic of collective defense of the Western Hemisphere, within the diplomatic framework of the Inter-American Treaty of Reciprocal Assistance. Latin American navies were to focus on anti-submarine warfare in a complementary role to the hemispheric leader, the United States Navy.

This relegated Brazil's submarines to the task of training surface forces (destroyers, the aircraft carrier NAeL Minas Gerais and its embarked air group) in convoy escort and the identification of enemy submarines. Warfare at sea thus came to encompass three dimensions, with priority given to surface forces and missions of maritime area control.

Even so, there had already been a technical capacity for offensive actions since the incorporation of SE Humaytá in 1929; this submarine had deterrent potential, being able to blockade an enemy port through minelaying or through its mere presence in the vicinity. At least against an adversary with inferior naval power, Brazilian submarines would be employed for attack. Brazilian doctrine still recognizes possibilities in the anti-submarine domain: against opposing submarines, the Submarine Force could attack bases and control centers or be positioned in their patrol zones and along the approaches to their potential targets.

Anti-submarine warfare lost priority from the 1970s onward, as the Brazilian Navy sought greater autonomy from its U.S. counterpart. The dream of the new generation of officers was a blue-water navy, centered on aircraft carriers and nuclear submarines, with full capabilities to project power and deny the enemy the use of the sea. They could point to the Falklands War: when the British Royal Navy, also focused on anti-submarine warfare, was forced to deal with a scenario unforeseen by its strategists, nuclear submarines proved to be its great advantage against the Argentine Navy. The sinking of ARA General Belgrano by the submarine HMS Conqueror denied the sea to the Argentines, who withdrew their surface fleet to port and left their garrison on the Falkland Islands isolated. The only Argentine warship to remain in action was the submarine ARA San Luis, which nevertheless required considerable British effort to protect the task force.

=== Sea denial ===
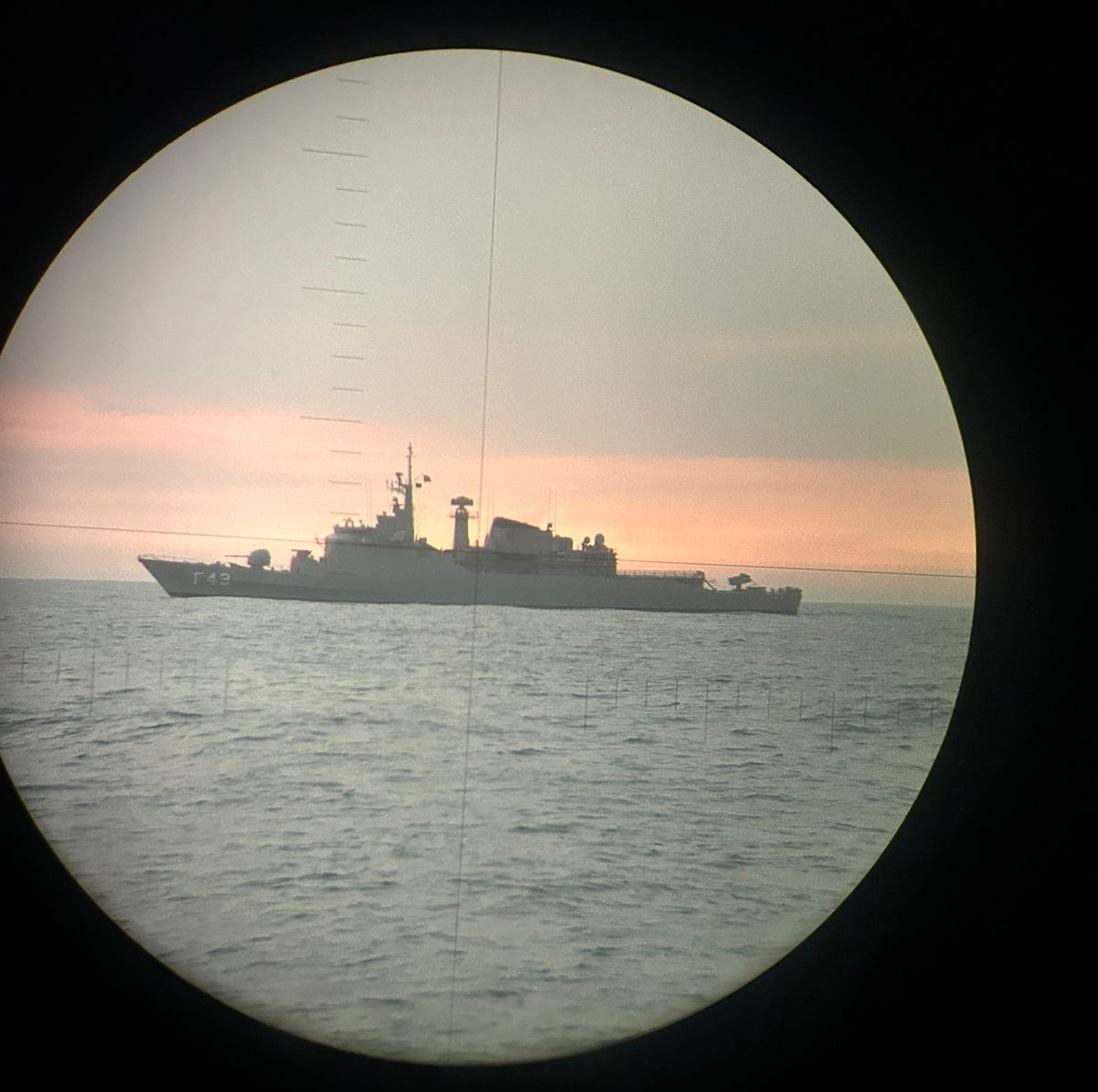
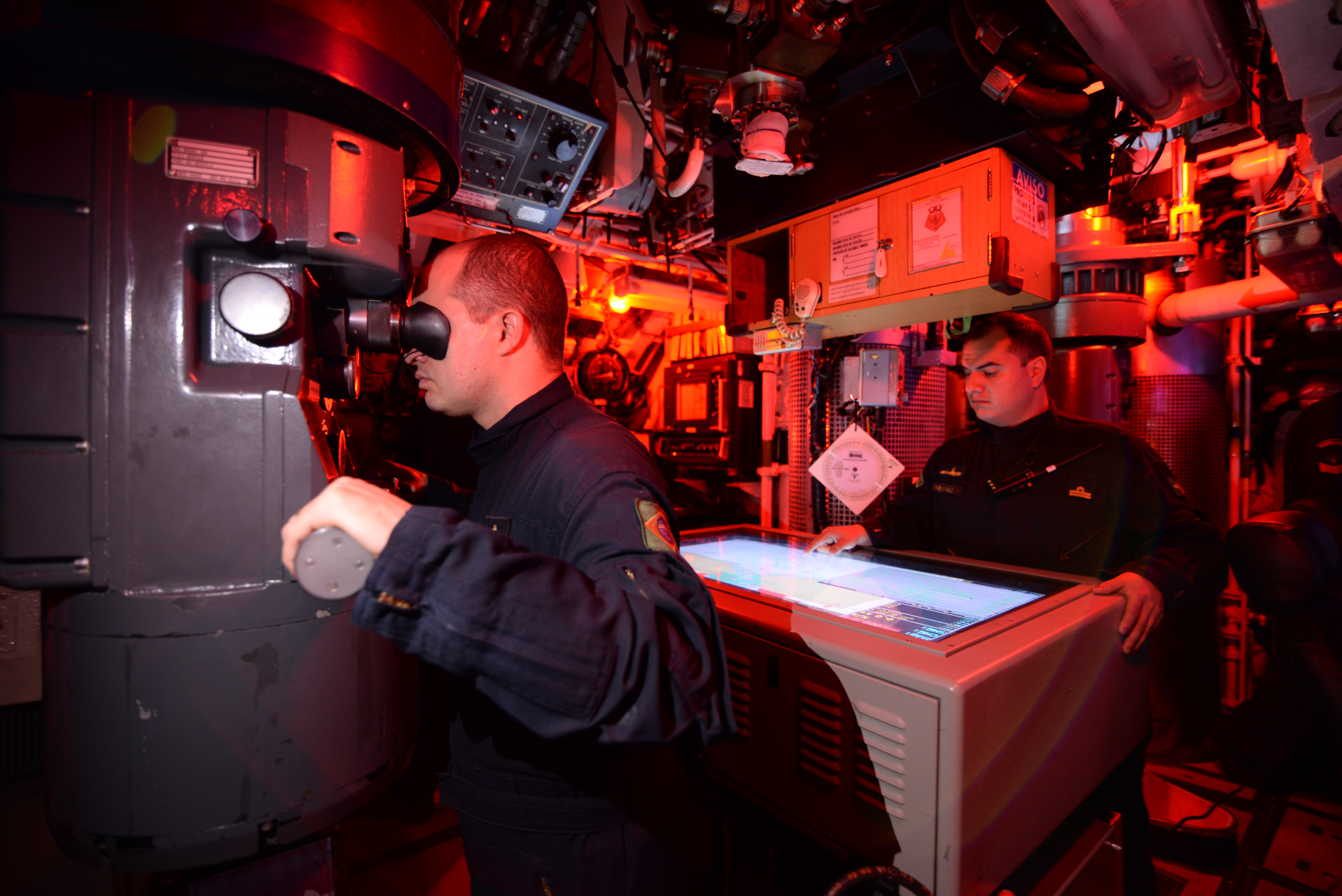
The frigate Liberal as seen from Tikuna's periscope (top), and a crewman from Tupi in the periscope (bottom)

The traditional employment of submarines is in sea denial (SD) against the enemy, and training in this regard took place even when anti-submarine function predominated. Sea denial is one of the basic tasks of naval power in Brazilian doctrine, a list that also includes maritime area control (MAC), power projection ashore (PPA), and deterrence. The fear of a hidden submarine is a classic sea-denial option: a much larger number of defensive forces is required to protect potential targets from a small number of submarines, producing an effect disproportionate to their numbers. The mere possibility can contribute to deterrence. Under certain circumstances, submarines may be used in MAC, or even in PPA, protecting landing ships or infiltrating special operations forces. Their secondary missions also include reconnaissance and intelligence gathering.

The official position in 1997 assigned equal value to SD and MAC tasks. At the turn of the 21st century, submarines were few and there was no clearly defined strategic direction. By inertia, MAC enjoyed some predominance. Some naval leaders already advocated the preponderance of SD, but the shift in mindset would have to be gradual.

The 2008 National Defense Strategy (END) established a hierarchy of tasks: "in the way of conceiving the relationship among the strategic tasks of sea denial, maritime area control, and power projection, the Brazilian Navy will be guided by unequal and joint development". "The priority is to ensure the means to deny the use of the sea to any concentration of enemy forces that approaches Brazil by maritime routes. Denial of the use of the sea to the enemy is what organizes, before any other strategic objectives are met, Brazil's maritime defense strategy. This priority has implications for the reconfiguration of naval forces". "To ensure the objective of sea denial, Brazil will rely on a submarine naval force of significant scale". In the face of a superior enemy or in the early stages of a conflict, submarines, satellites, and aircraft would be the first to enter action, while surface assets would serve as a tactical or strategic reserve.

Subsequent editions of the END reiterated the intention to build a substantial submarine force. The 2012 END acknowledged two strategic options: one focused on defending the coastline and jurisdictional waters against a more dangerous adversary, prioritizing submarines, and another centered on MAC and PPA, with a balanced naval force.

=== Nuclear propulsion ===
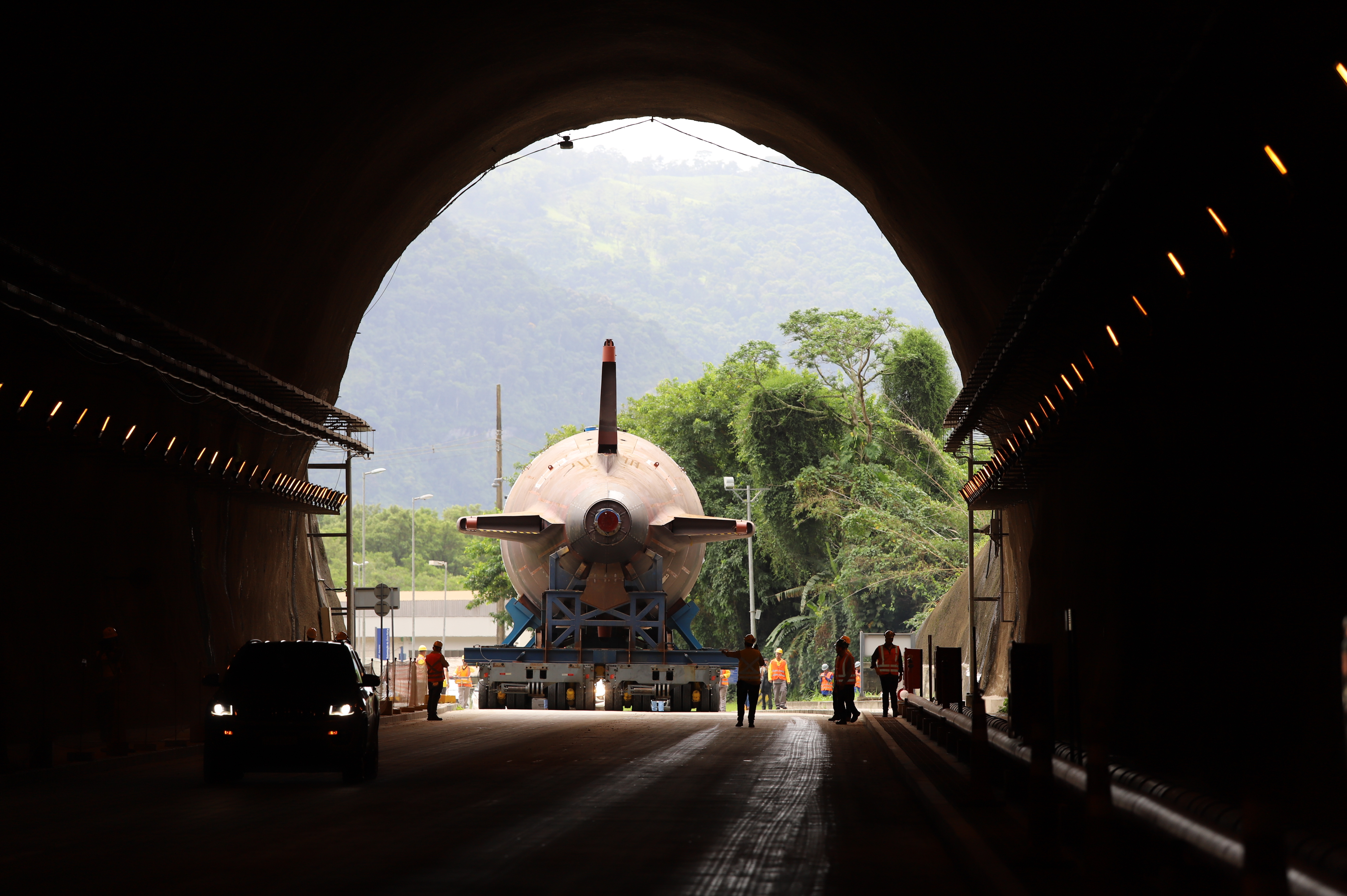
Transfer of a section of the conventional submarine Almirante Karam, under construction in 2023

In the sea-denial (SD) task, the submarines historically and currently available would be best employed patrolling focal areas, with designated war or exclusion zones to keep civilian navigation away, supported by reconnaissance assets, defensive minefields, naval installations, and land-based aviation. Their limitation lies in conventional, or diesel-electric, propulsion.

The speed, endurance, and stealth of conventional submarines are lower. They must periodically rise to a certain depth–the periscope depth–extend a snorkel to the surface, and supply air to the diesel engines that recharge its batteries. In doing so, they expose themselves to visual, acoustic, and radar detection. Below periscope depth, the vessel must conserve battery power. Consequently, its most suitable employment is in a positional or patrol strategy, not far from the coast, with adequate intelligence on the routes of enemy convoys. It effectively has a single opportunity to attack, since it can evade at high speed but must then slow down to reposition for a new attack. If the conventional submarine does not receive authorization to attack when the opportunity arises, it loses its strategic value; if it attacks without authorization, it may escalate the crisis. It can be conceived as a "mobile minefield".

The limitations of the conventional submarine can be mitigated by air-independent propulsion (AIP) technology, which has become increasingly common among 21st-century navies. AIP is not used throughout the entire voyage, but only to supplement periods of higher energy demand. The Brazilian Navy rejected this option in favor of a long-standing objective: nuclear propulsion. Since 1979 it has pursued a nuclear program aimed at the future construction of a reactor. Brazilian 21st-century doctrine advocates a mixed submarine force, nuclear and conventional. Nuclear submarines would operate in large maritime areas, while conventional submarines would operate closer to the coast. The advantages of the nuclear submarine in blue waters diminish in the brown waters of the littoral, where the conventional submarine mitigates its weaknesses.

The reactor of a nuclear submarine generates more energy and does not depend on oxygen. Beyond the positional strategy typical of a conventional submarine, it can be employed in a strategy of movement, as it does not need to snorkel and can sustain high speeds for long periods. In this way, it can accompany surface forces on the high seas and carry out successive attacks and evasions, with greater chances of survival. Compared to the conventional submarine, it is larger, has greater minimum and average operating depths, and is more expensive to build. In return, it can patrol the same area as a larger number of conventional submarines, as it spends less time on maintenance transits and inactive periods.

In the English-language nomenclature, conventional submarines are designated SSK, and the nuclear-powered submarines envisioned by Brazil are designated SSN. To emphasize that the submarine will not carry nuclear weapons, the Brazilian Navy refers to its project as a "nuclear-powered conventional submarine" (submarino convencional de propulsão nuclear – SCNA), which can be confusing abroad, where "conventional submarine" is synonymous with a diesel-electric–powered submarine. There are submarines with both nuclear propulsion and nuclear armament–the ballistic missile submarines–designated SSBN. Admiral Mauro César Rodrigues Pereira, Minister of the Navy from 1995 to 1999, denied that a Brazilian SSBN was ever contemplated.

=== Geopolitical considerations ===
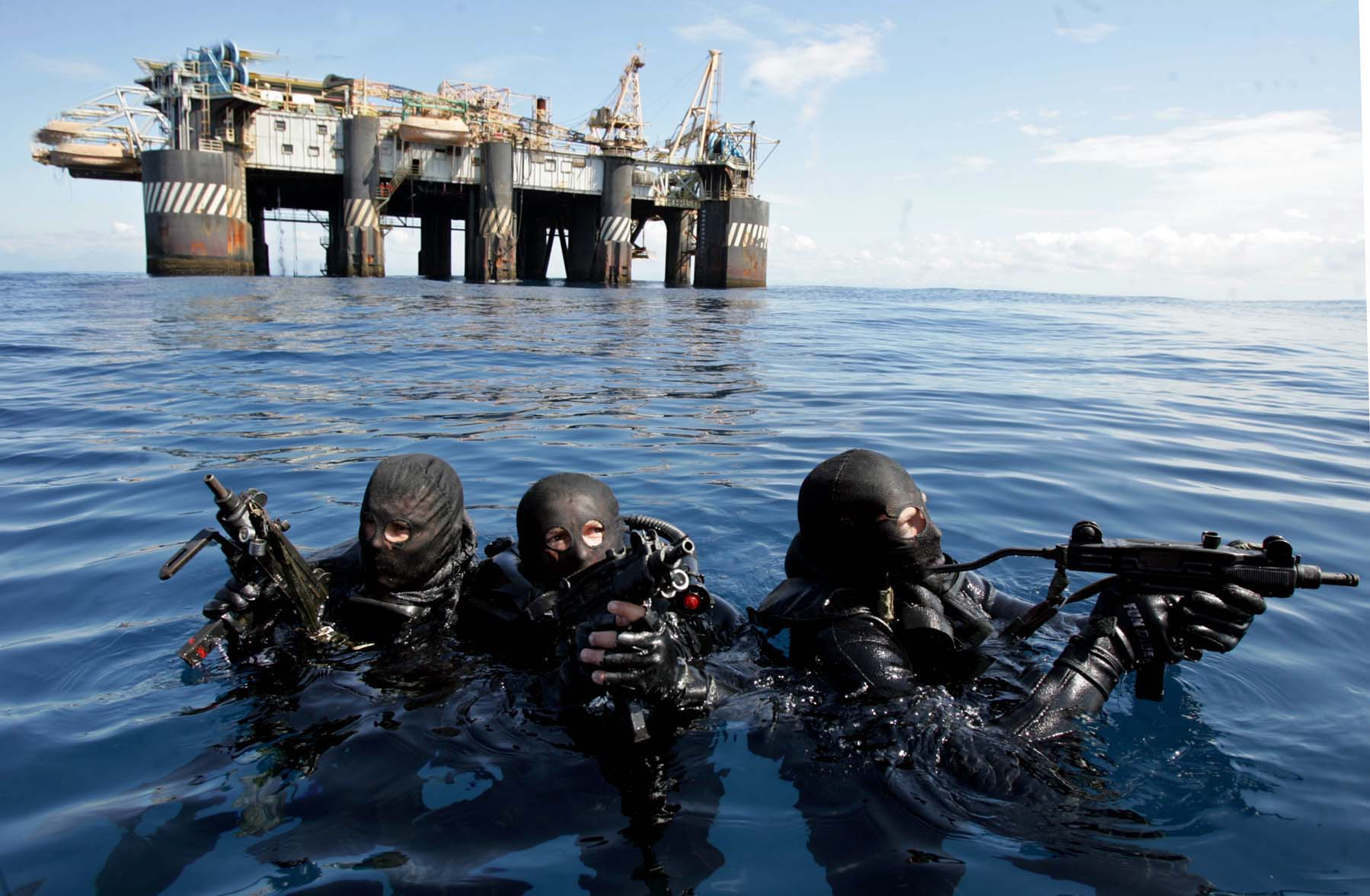
Combat divers of the Submarine Force in the vicinity of an oil platform

At the beginning of the 21st century, a conventional naval war appears unlikely in South America, and finding a role for submarines is a difficulty shared by regional navies. The regional trend has not been toward renewing submarine flotillas. Brazilian defense documents cite material limitations, the vastness of the jurisdictional waters to be defended, and the conditions of the surrounding strategic environment to explain the focus on sea denial. This is typically the strategy of the weaker side in a naval war. Not every state has the naval power to control the ocean surface wherever it wishes, employing its war and merchant navies there. What weaker navies can do is infiltrate their submarines into space controlled by the enemy and reduce that control. This type of conflict is "littoral warfare", in which the weaker side cannot fight oceanic battles but can defend its coastline with anti-access/area-denial (A2/AD) instruments, among them submarines.

In the event of war, the Brazilian Navy no longer necessarily sees itself on the "stronger side", as it did in the World Wars and the Cold War. Brazil may have to face an oceanic campaign on its own. The END mentions a "broad spectrum of combat circumstances", including situations "when the enemy force is much more powerful", which would highlight the role of submarines. Rivalry with Argentina, the possible intervention of world powers along the Brazilian coast, and the discovery of pre-salt oil fields are historical justifications for the ambition of a Brazilian nuclear submarine. At present, it is not explained to the public in terms of a defined enemy or a need to project power, but on the basis of defending the country's exclusive economic zone and continental shelf–the "Blue Amazon". External observers question to what extent patrolling natural resources is an objective suited to the capabilities of this instrument, and whether the stated objective truly reflects the Navy's intentions.

The desire to possess a nuclear submarine goes beyond purely military arguments and involves institutional inertia, national pride, ambitions for technological autonomy, and the associated prestige. A nuclear submarine could project Brazilian power into distant seas, even if such ambition does not exist in current foreign policy. Its existence could narrow the gap between nuclear and non-nuclear powers. Official language is ambitious: Ilques Barbosa, Commander of the Navy from 2019 to 2021, spoke of a future "maximum force of strategic deterrence of our country". Debate continues over whether this ambition justifies the substantial investments required and the competition with resources for other sectors of the fleet, and the budget has proven to be the greatest obstacle to the nuclear submarine program. The promised effect will only materialize if all systems–especially weapons systems–have sufficient availability and effectiveness.

=== Operation zones ===
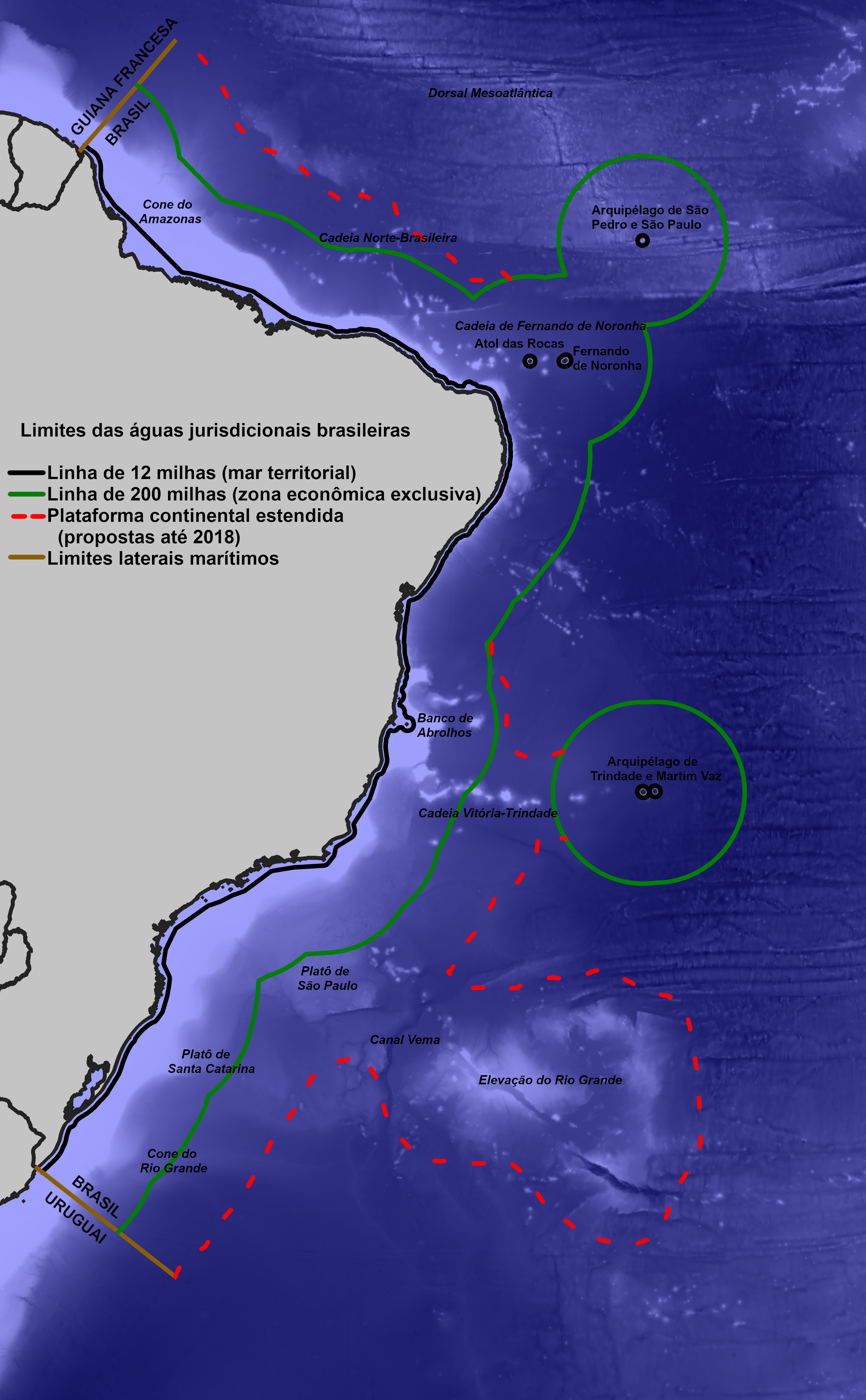
Bathymetry of the Brazilian continental shelf

Potential patrol zones have already been studied by the general staffs of the Navy and the Submarine Force. For the conventional flotilla, these would include the Amazon River delta, the northeastern salient, the ports of Salvador and Santos, the southern coast of Rio Grande do Sul, and other regions, according to the density of maritime traffic, oil platforms, and foreign fishing. They would extend up to 540 kilometers from the coast. In a presentation to the Brazilian Senate in 2009, Defense Minister Nelson Jobim used a map in which nuclear submarines patrol the limits of the "Blue Amazon", while conventional submarines occupy more internal positions, generally in oil-producing areas. The positions were hypothetical, with no defined enemy.

Two focal areas for conventional submarines were proposed by a commentator in the Revista Marítima Brasileira: one around Cabo Frio, near the Rio–São Paulo axis and the Campos oil basin, and another around Fernando de Noronha, where maritime lines of communication to the Northern Hemisphere converge. The second area would be logistically more difficult. The Maritime Defense Strategy, a Navy planning document for the period 2024–2044, stipulates organizing submarines into a "Force of Attrition", capable of "achieving at least one of the following effects: disrupting maritime lines of communication at a port in the strategic environment; and denying the use of the following maritime areas of interest: ERG (Rio Grande Rise); the vicinity of oceanic islands; the mouth of the Amazon River; and the Santos and Campos oil basins".

For the nuclear submarine, long mission durations would allow extensive patrols, with the caveat that its armament would not be suitable for maritime crime, which is the routine target of Navy patrols. At most, in such cases, it would alert district assets or the fleet. There is precedent–the Ecuadorian Navy has already used the conventional submarine Huancavilca against illegal fishing–but a large number of small patrol vessels could be acquired for a fraction of the cost of a nuclear submarine.

== Number of submarines ==
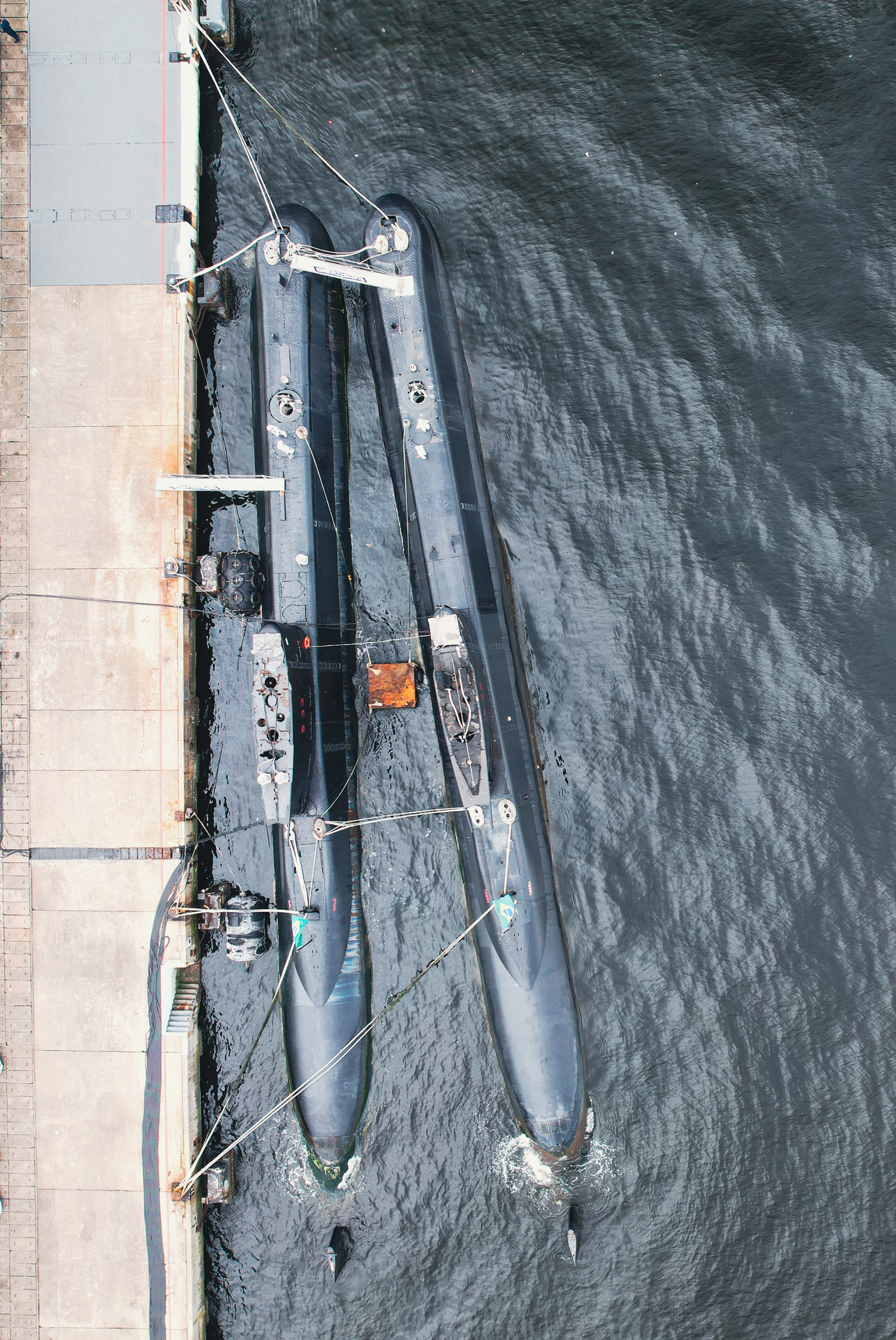
Timbira and Tapajó dokced in Mocanguê Island

An average of four to five submarines were in service in Brazil from 1913 to 2006, remaining at eight or more between 1966 and 1992 and reaching a maximum of ten in 1977–1978. The 1977 naval program planned for twelve submarines, and the 2009 Navy Organization and Equipment Plan (PAEMB) proposed a total of 21, but only five were ordered in the following years. The 2023 Maritime Defense Strategy maintained the number at five submarines–four conventional and one nuclear. By the end of 2024, four submarines were in service. Assuming a constant production rate of one submarine every five years, a service life of 40 years, and a mid-life modernization, operating more than eight submarines would not be feasible.

Five submarines is a small number for Brazil's defensive strategy and for the vast expanse of sea to be defended. Other economies of comparable size operate larger and more numerous submarines. The Royal Australian Navy, for example, had six large submarines in 2005, even while planning to use them only in restricted theaters of operation. In 2017, Brazil's fleet of five submarines was the second smallest among the BRICS navies, behind China (68), Russia (63), and India (15), and ahead of South Africa (3). Worldwide, navies with the same number of submarines included Sweden, Poland, and Egypt.

In South America, Brazil ranked second, behind Peru, which had six submarines. The number of submarines on the continent remained almost constant during the first two decades of the 21st century. The cumulative displacement of the six Peruvian submarines–7,710 tonnes–was the largest on the continent in 2013, compared with 7,310 tonnes for their Brazilian counterparts, 5,920 for the Chilean Navy, and 3,512 for the Argentine Navy. Peruvian submarines were armed with a total of 82 torpedoes, Brazilian ones with 80, Argentine with 66, and Chilean with 64. However, the Chilean Navy enjoyed technological superiority, achieving the greatest submerged depth and the longest torpedo range, and was also capable of launching Exocet SM39 anti-ship missiles. Chile had been at the technological forefront since 2005, when it received its first Scorpène-class submarine, taking over the lead from Argentina. The balance would tilt toward Brazil after the commissioning of its own Scorpène submarines. Brazil and Chile operated the only recently built submarines in South America in 2023; all others dated from the 1970s and 1980s.

It is unlikely that the entire force would be available at the same time, as submarines are subject to a rotation of prolonged maintenance periods. In 2011, for example, only two of the five in service were available, amid a broader picture of low availability of Brazilian Armed Forces assets. The traditional rule of thumb in foreign navies is that for each submarine on operations, one is preparing and another is recovering from recent operations. The British and French navies assume a total of four nuclear submarines for each one at sea. For a flotilla of only one submarine, the saying applies: "he who has only one has none". To keep two or three conventional submarines permanently on mission, it would be necessary to maintain eight in service.

Submarines of the Tupi and Tikuna classes averaged 83.25 days at sea in 2005, 63.88 in 2006, and 71.1 in 2007–low figures that hinder training. The average annual expenditure per submarine from 2005 to 2008 was nine million dollars. The largest direct expenses relate to repairs and spare parts rather than fuel and lubricants. Even so, the usual way to save resources is to cut operating time.

== Submarine classes ==
The history of Brazilian submarines can be periodized according to the countries from which their technology originated: Italy, with the Foca (1914–1933), Balilla (1929–1950), and Perla (1937–1959) classes; the United States, with the Fleet Type I (1957–1967), Fleet Type II (1963–1973), Guppy II (1972–1993), and Guppy III (1973–1992) classes; the United Kingdom, with the Oberon class (1973–2001); Germany, with the IKL-209-1400/Tupi class (1989–present) and its derivative, the Tikuna class (2005–present); and France, with the Scorpène/Riachuelo class (2022–present). From the Tupi class onward, Brazilian industry began assembling the submarines.

=== Italian origin ===
==== Foca/F class ====
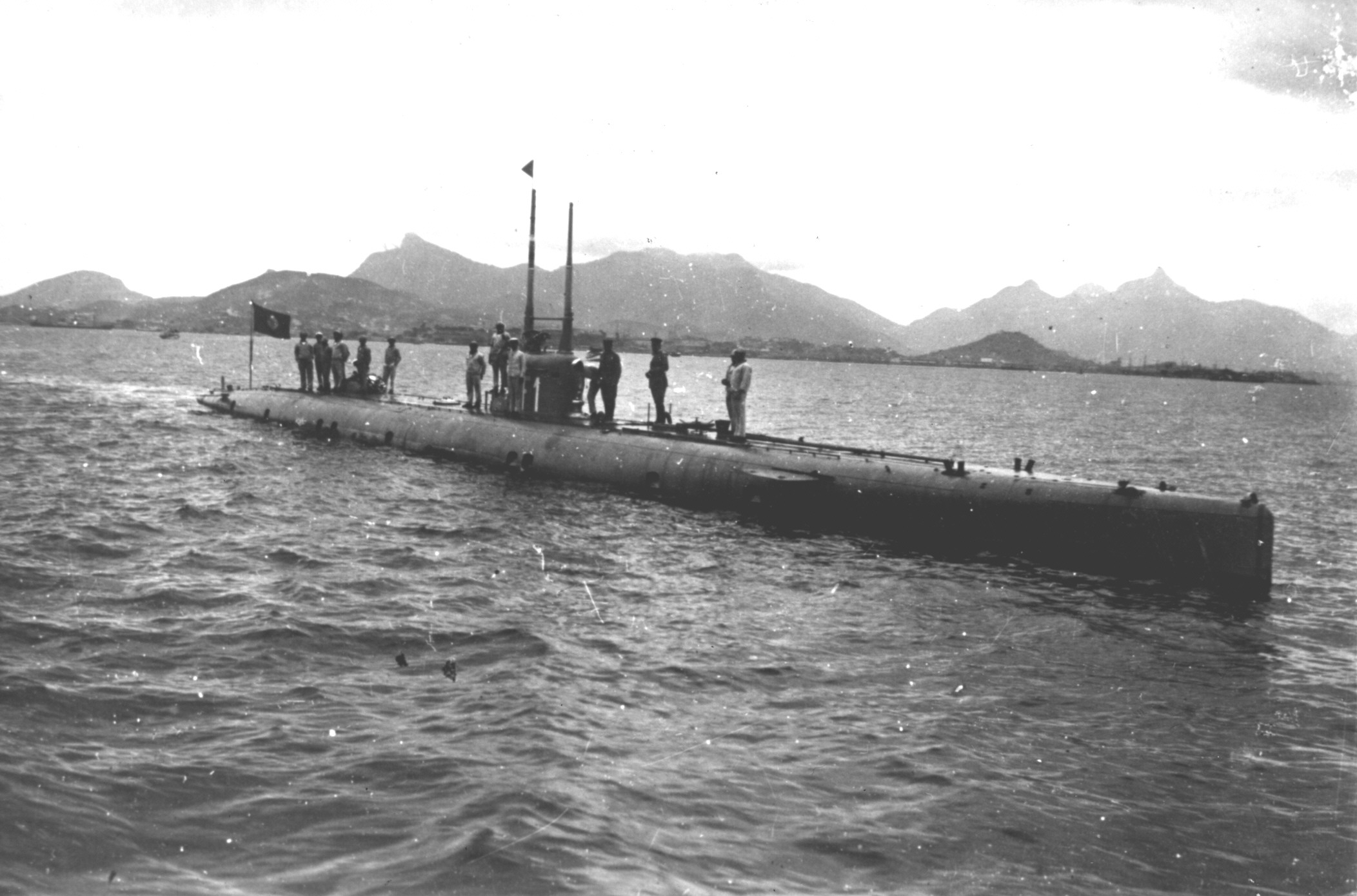
Submersible F1

A class of three submersibles–the F1 (1913–1933), F3 (1914–1933), and F5 (1914–1933)–each with a displacement of 370 tons fully loaded, a crew of 23, a maximum diving depth of forty meters, a top speed of 13.5 knots on the surface and 8.5 knots submerged, and armament consisting of two 18-inch torpedo tubes with a total stowage of four torpedoes. Their procurement was part of the South American dreadnought race, as the Navy sought to overcome its material inferiority relative to Argentina and Chile. Submersibles had been on the agenda of the Ministry of the Navy since the administration of Admiral Júlio de Noronha (1902–1906), but they were not a priority in light of ambitious investments in large surface battleships. The contract was signed during the tenure of Admiral Marques de Leão (1910–1912), and the submersibles were built in Italy, a prominent country in the sector.

The class was the most effective of the coastal submersibles of the Regia Marina and found other buyers in the Portuguese and Spanish navies. In Brazil, the three submersibles were used to train crews, usually in Guanabara Bay, occasionally in Ilha Grande Bay, Cabo Frio, and São Sebastião, and once in Santos. During the First World War, they patrolled the approaches to the port of Rio de Janeiro. The class had limited combat power, and its merit lay in forming the first generations of Brazilian submariners.

Numerous officers and enlisted men of the Submersible Flotilla joined the tenentist movement in 1924, taking part in the conspiracy led by Captain Protógenes Guimarães to overthrow the government of Artur Bernardes. The commanders of F1 and F5 were conspirators, while the commander of F3 remained loyal to the government. On the night of 21 October, F1 and F5 were manned and armed, awaiting a gun salvo from the battleships that would signal the start of the revolt, but it never came. The discovery of the conspiracy and the subsequent arrests soon compromised the operational capability of these submarines. In the following month, the flotilla was tasked with attacking the battleship São Paulo when its crew mutinied, but no engagement occurred and the ship left Guanabara Bay.

==== Balilla ====
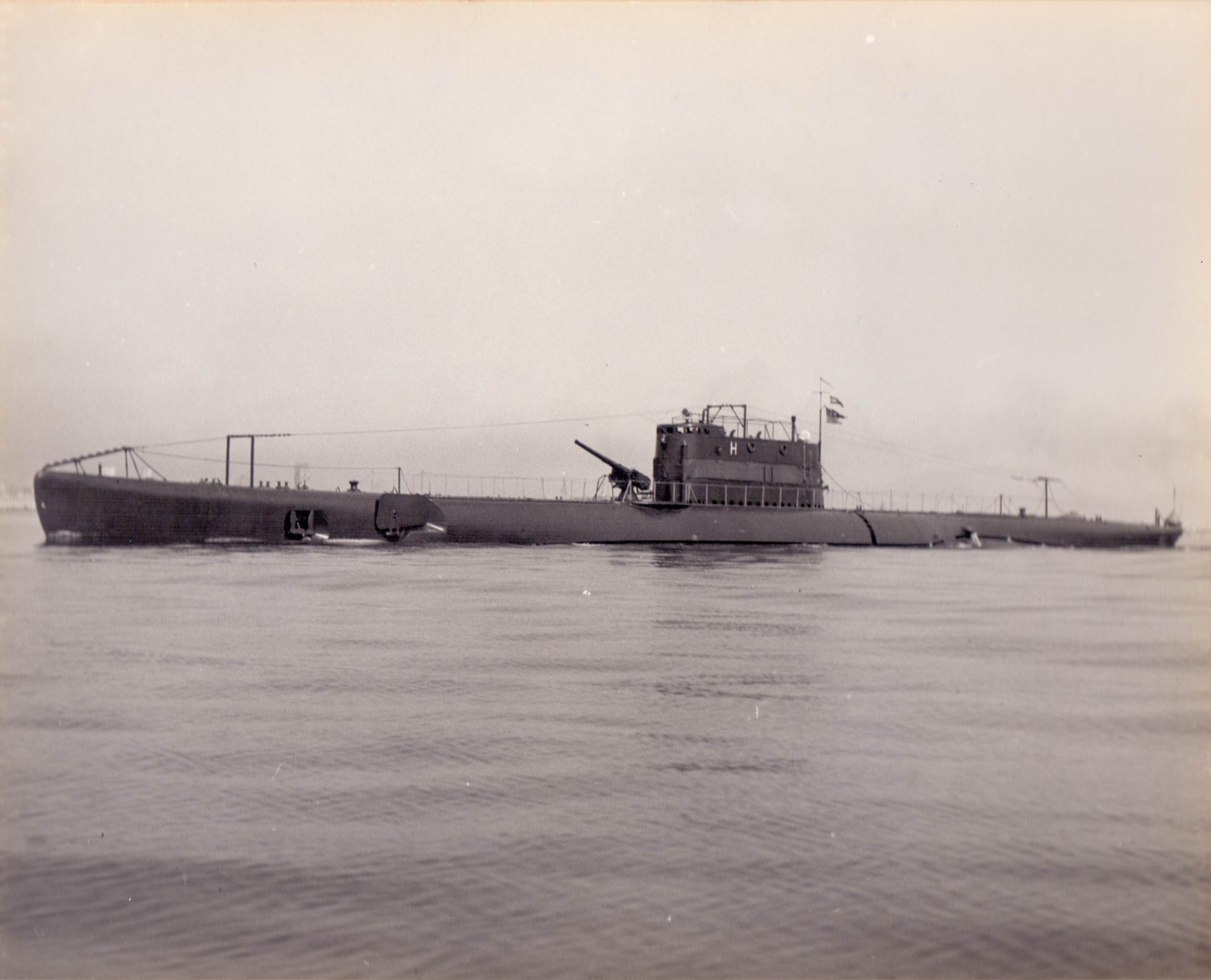
Humaytá

A single-submarine class, the SE Humaytá (1929–1950), with a displacement of 1,427 tons (standard) and 1,884 tons (fully loaded)–large for its time–68 crew members, and a maximum diving depth of 100 meters. It was armed with six 21-inch torpedo tubes, with capacity for twelve torpedoes (Whitehead type SI), one 120 mm/41-caliber gun, two 13.2 mm Hotchkiss machine guns, and sixteen Ansaldo mines. Designed for long-range operations, it had a range of 13,000 nautical miles at a surface speed of seven knots, or 80 nautical miles at four knots submerged, reaching maximum speeds of 18.5 knots on the surface and ten knots submerged. Designated in Brazil as a "fleet submarine" (submarino de esquadra – SE), it can be considered the first Brazilian submarine. Three other submarines of the same class served in Italy.

From 1933 to 1937, between the decommissioning of the Foca class and the incorporation of the Perla class, the Submersible Flotilla was disbanded and Humaytá was placed directly under the Mobile Defense Command of the Port of Rio de Janeiro. It carried out the country's first submarine minelaying operations and faced frequent and difficult maintenance, but remained active during the Second World War, when it was assigned patrol missions and the training of Brazilian and American surface escorts and aircrews.

==== Tupy/T class ====
A class of three submarines–the S Tupy, S Tymbira, and S Tamoyo–all commissioned in 1937 and decommissioned in 1959. Each displaced 615 tons (standard) and 853 tons (fully loaded), with a crew of 33, a maximum diving depth of 80 meters, a top speed of fourteen knots on the surface or 7.5 knots submerged, and a range of 2,150 nautical miles at 8.5 knots on the surface or 72 nautical miles at four knots submerged. The class was armed with six 21-inch torpedo tubes, one 100 mm/41-caliber gun, and four 13.2 mm Hotchkiss machine guns. They were smaller patrol submarines of the 600-ton type, which also served with the Italian Navy. Their limitations were comparable to those of the F class.

The T class was acquired at a time when the government faced financial difficulties in replacing the aging vessels contemporary with the earlier F class. The plan called for six submarines, but Italy's entry into the Second World War in 1940 interrupted further deliveries, and plans to build the remaining three in Brazil were overtaken by other priorities. When Brazil entered the war, the T class was not capable of directly engaging enemy submarines along the coast. However, precisely because they were of Italian design–a country at war with Brazil–they were well suited for anti-submarine training. The Submarine Flotilla was transferred to Recife and placed under the Northeastern Naval Force to serve as a "target" in the training of Brazilian and American ships and aircraft. The submarine would dive while towing a buoy on the surface, as anti-submarine forces simulated attacks.

=== American origin ===
==== Fleet Type ====
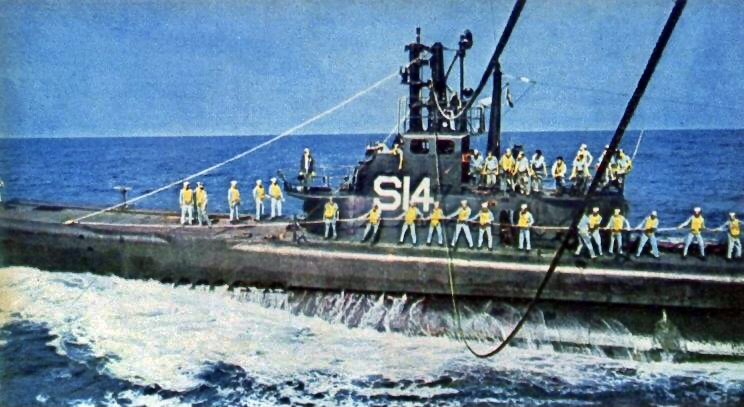
Humaitá

A designation applied to two classes–the Gato or Fleet Type I and the Balao or Fleet Type II–both composed of U.S. submarines that were veterans of the Second World War. The former was represented by S Humaitá (1957–1967) and S Riachuelo (1957–1966), formerly USS Muskallunge and USS Paddle, respectively. The latter comprised S Rio Grande do Sul (1963–1972) and S Bahia (1963–1973), formerly USS Sand Lance and USS Plaice, respectively.

Each Gato displaced 1,475 tons (surface, fully loaded) or 2,370 tons (submerged), with a crew of seventy, a maximum diving depth of 91 meters, a top speed of twenty knots on the surface or 8.7 knots submerged, and a range of twelve thousand nautical miles at ten knots on the surface. They were armed with ten 21-inch torpedo tubes, with capacity for 24 torpedoes. The Balao class was slightly improved, its main advantage being a more powerful sonar, which could guide attacks with the submarine below periscope depth.

These submarines had already been obsolete since the end of the war, with the advent of new snorkel-equipped submarines, and were transferred under the Brazil–United States Military Agreement. The draft U.S. loan legislation for the Gato class cited the "need for submarines so that the Brazilian Navy may have elements with which to train in the conduct of anti-submarine warfare", and stated: "The United States Navy has 24 light-hull submarines in its reserve fleet. These submarines are no longer considered effective combat units. If they were reactivated in a future emergency, they would probably be used for our own training. It is estimated that two of these submarines may be loaned to Brazil without detriment to our potential mobilization". For Brazil, the need was to replace the T class, whose maintenance had already become difficult due to a lack of spare parts. In addition to the transfer of materiel, Brazilian submariners were sent to courses in the United States.

The torpedoes were imported and would continue to be so for decades. The Navy even organized a factory at Ponta da Armação, where twenty 21-inch Mk. XV mod. III torpedoes were assembled using American plans, but it was easier to import armaments through the Military Agreement. At the outset of the Lobster War in 1963, Humaitá was unfit to sail and Riachuelo could be made ready within ten days. Owing to the focus on anti-submarine training, none of their torpedoes had live warheads, and it was necessary to fill nine exercise heads with TNT, with no certainty that they would function in combat. The submarine was transferred to Recife as part of the naval mobilization against France. Two of the submarines were moored at Mocanguê Island during the coup d'état the following year. Admiral and former Minister of the Navy Sílvio Heck attempted to incite the force to revolt, but found out that one submarine lacked spare parts and the other lacked crewmen.

==== Guppy ====
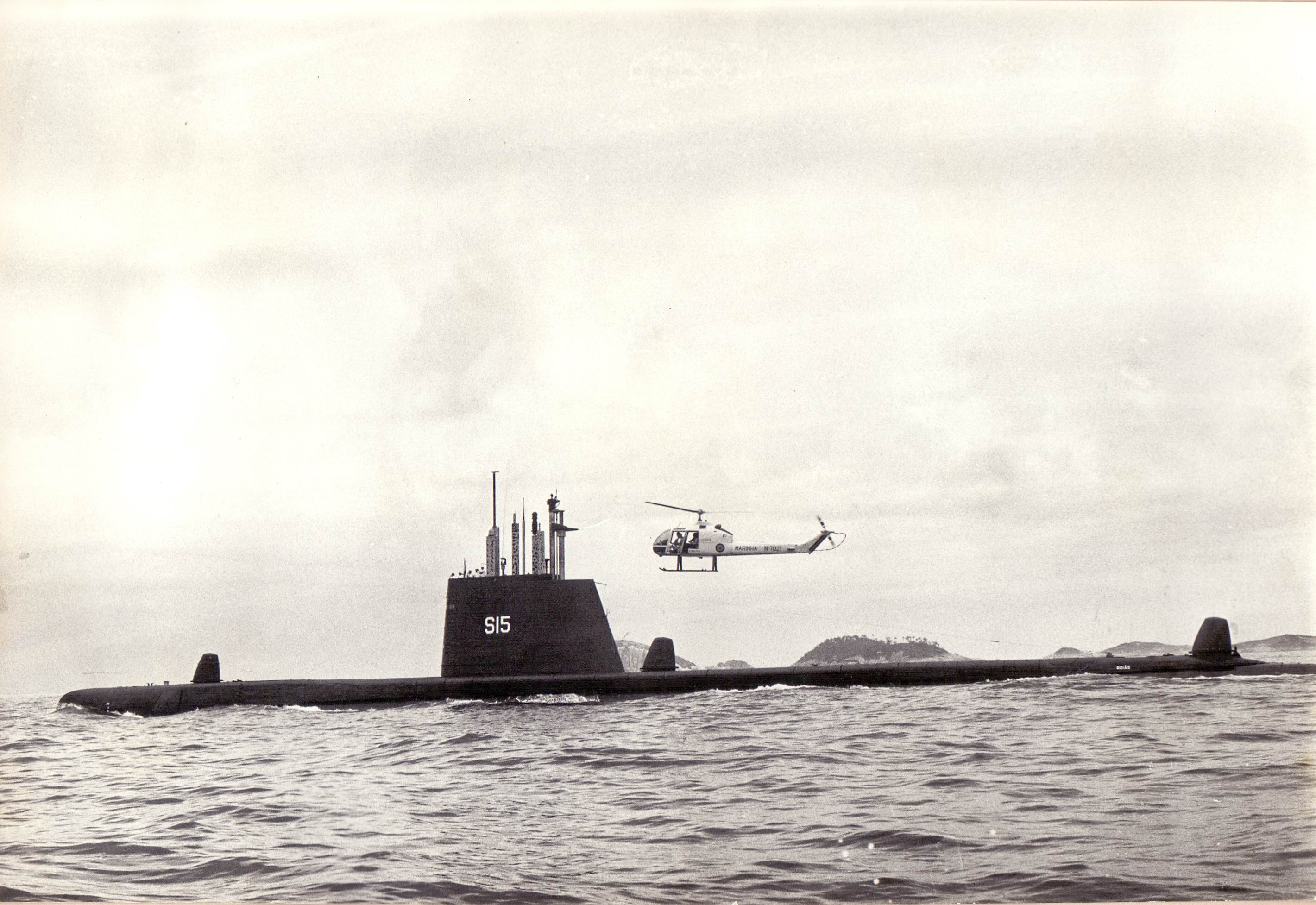
Goiás

A designation applied to two groups, Guppy II and Guppy III. The former consisted of S Guanabara (1972–1983), S Rio Grande do Sul (1972–1978), S Bahia (1972–1993), S Rio de Janeiro (1972–1978), and S Ceará (1973–1987), which in the United States Navy had been USS Dogfish, USS Grampus, USS Sea Leopard, USS Odax, and USS Amberjack. The latter consisted of S Goiás (1973–1990) and S Amazonas (1973–1992), formerly USS Trumpetfish and USS Greenfish, respectively. The Guppy boats were Second World War submarines of the Gato, Balao, and Tench classes modernized under the Greater Underwater Propulsion Power Program.

The Guppy II displaced 1,870 tons (fully loaded on the surface) or 2,420 tons (submerged), with a crew of 83, a maximum diving depth of 122 meters, a top speed of eighteen knots on the surface or fifteen knots submerged, and a range of twelve thousand nautical miles at ten knots on the surface or submerged with snorkel. Armament consisted of ten 21-inch torpedo tubes, with a total capacity of 24 torpedoes. The Guppy III were slightly larger, displacing 1,975 tons on the surface and 2,450 tons submerged, and reached a top speed of twenty knots on the surface, with a range of fifteen thousand nautical miles at eight knots. Armament and crew were the same.

The greatest technological advance was the snorkel, which eliminated the need to surface in order to recharge the batteries. Like several U.S. destroyers received during the same period, the Guppy submarines had long service lives, but they were acquired mainly to fill gaps until the incorporation of new assets planned under a re-equipment program in the second half of the 1960s.

=== British origin ===
==== Oberon ====
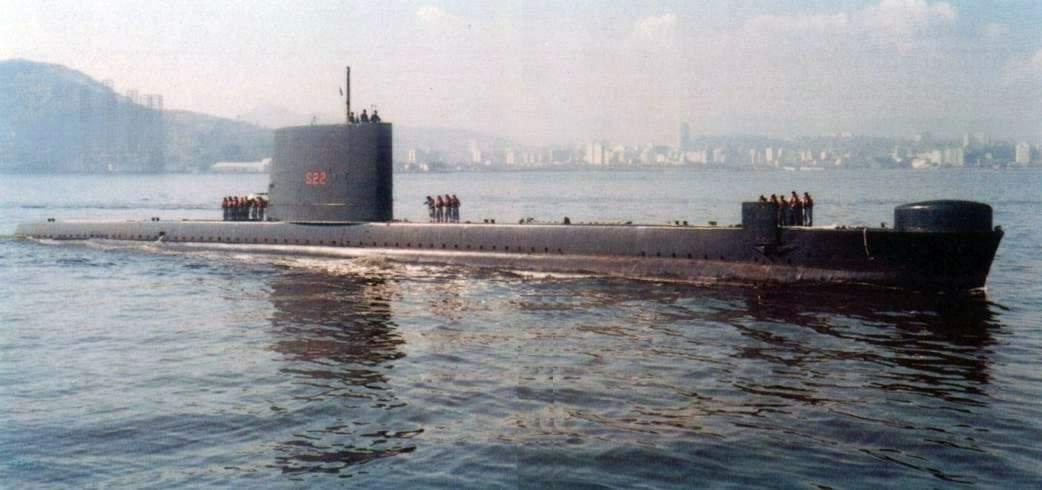
Riachuelo

A class of three submarines–the S Humaitá (1973–1996), S Tonelero (1977–2001), and S Riachuelo (1977–1997). Each displaced 2,040 tons (fully loaded on the surface) or 2,410 tons (submerged), with a crew of 74, a maximum speed of 17.5 knots on the surface or fifteen knots submerged, a range of eleven thousand nautical miles at eleven knots, and an endurance of 56 days. Although comparable in size to the Guppy boats, the Oberon class had less internal space and crew comfort. They were armed with eight 21-inch torpedo tubes, with a total capacity of 24 torpedoes, and could also lay mines and deploy decoys. Several torpedoes could be carried: the new wire-guided Mk. 24 Tigerfish, the Mk. 37 Mod. 2, and the older Mk. 8 Mod. 4. The Mk. 24 was still under development when acquired and performed poorly in firing tests. The Brazilian Navy rejected British offers of an improved version, the Mk. 24 Mod. 1.

The class represented a technological leap for the Submarine Force, introducing it to the computer age, and a cultural shift through contact with the Royal Navy, where some officers even completed the submarine commanding officer's course, the "Perisher". The Oberon boats were acquired together with the British-built Niterói-class frigates, at a time of distancing from U.S. suppliers. As Brazil's industry was not yet capable of assembling a submarine on its own, the British–who imposed fewer restrictions on the transfer of more advanced technologies–were the alternative. The class was also operated by the British, Australian, Chilean, and Canadian navies.

The class would be involved in the most serious accident in the history of the Submarine Force. On 24 December 2000, Tonelero, the last Oberon still in service, sank at the pier of the Rio de Janeiro Navy Arsenal, where it was undergoing repairs, due to multiple human failures. All crew members escaped unharmed and the submarine was refloated within a few days, but its retirement was brought forward. According to Lieutenant Commander Marcelo Glatthardt, the accident was for the Brazilian Navy what the sinking of the Russian submarine Kursk months earlier had been for world public opinion, damaging its image before the Brazilian public and highlighting how difficult a rescue operation would be on the high seas. Submarine accidents are uncommon in South America, but there are cases, some of them fatal. An anonymous commander also reported an incident in which Humaitá was struck by its own torpedo, which was not fitted with an explosive warhead. The Kursk accident, attributed to the explosion of a torpedo, led to the cancellation of a Swedish–Brazilian heavy torpedo project with specifications similar to the Russian model.

=== German origin ===
==== Type 209/Tupi and Tikuna ====
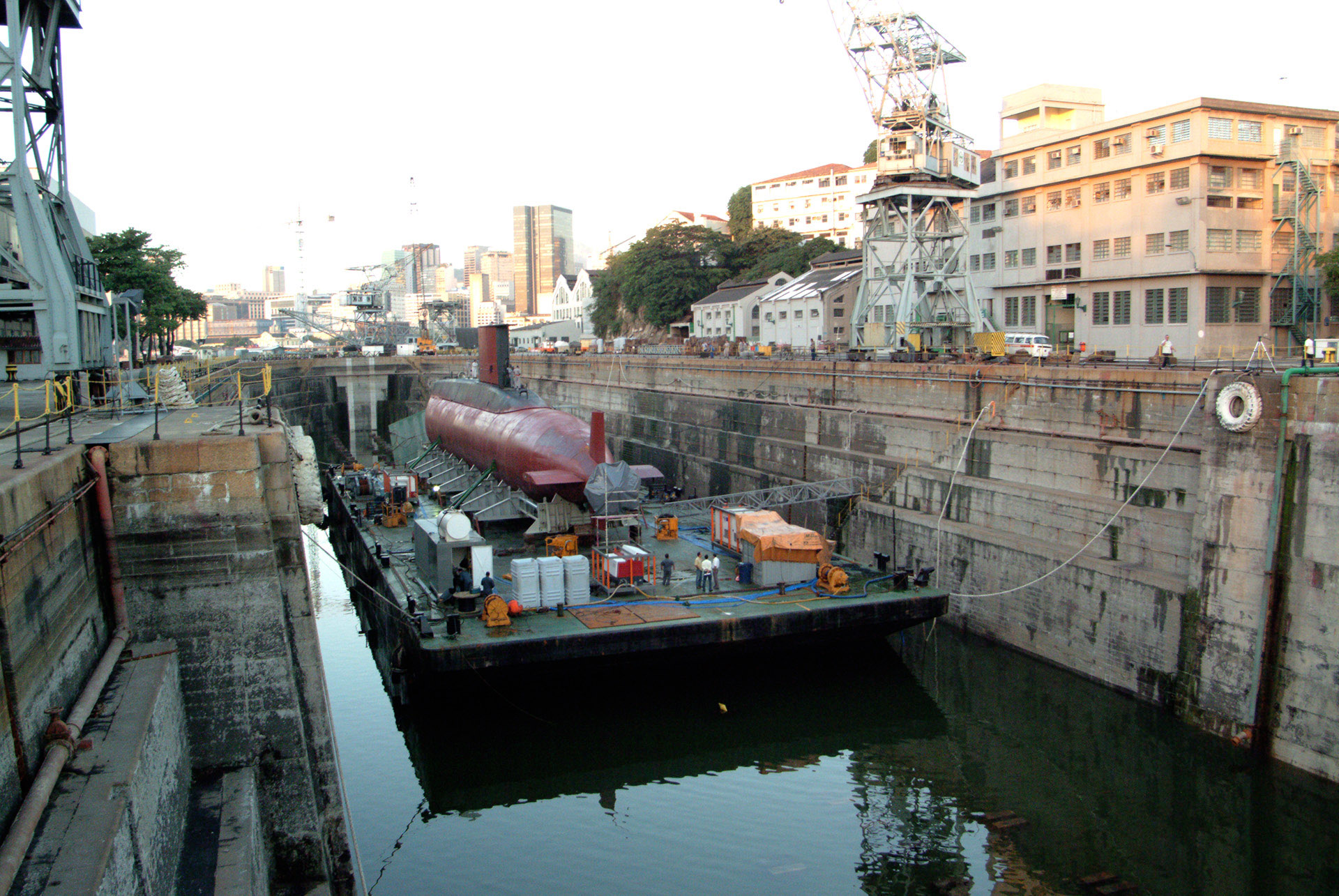
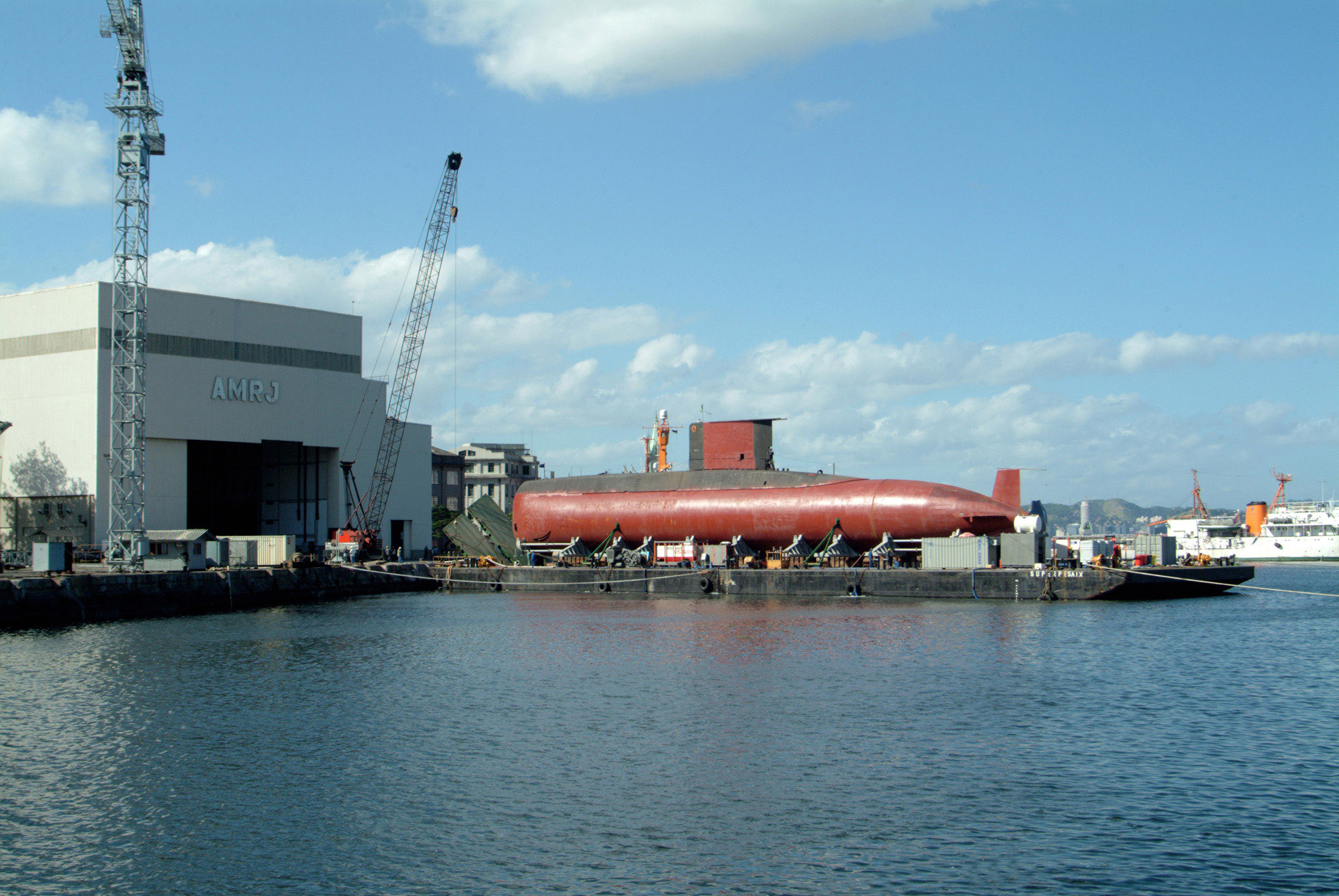
Timbira (S-32) at the Rio de Janeiro Navy Arsenal

A class of five submarines–the S Tupi (1989–present), S Tamoio (1994–2023), S Timbira (1996–2023), S Tapajó (1999–2023) and S Tikuna (2005–present). Tikuna is sometimes referred to as a distinct class, which would have had a second unit, Tapuia (S-35), whose construction was cancelled due to lack of funds.

The first four displaced 1,150 tons on the surface and 1,440 tons submerged, with a crew of 42, a maximum diving depth of 250 meters, a top speed of eleven knots on the surface and 21.5 knots submerged, an endurance of 50 days and a range of ten thousand nautical miles at eight knots on the surface or with snorkel, or four hundred miles at four knots submerged, with battery power. Tikuna is an improved version with a surface displacement of 1,550 tons, a crew of 36 and a thirty percent greater range. All five were armed with eight 21-inch torpedo tubes, with a capacity of sixteen torpedoes. The heavy torpedoes were initially the same Tigerfish torpedoes as Oberon's, replaced in 2006 by the American-made Mk. 48 Mod. 6 AT torpedoes.

Tupi was assembled in Germany and the rest of the fleet in Brazil, thus making it the first country in the Southern Hemisphere to build submarines. 70 engineers, technicians, and workers were trained at the Howaldtswerke-Deutsche Werft shipyard in Kiel, and the Rio de Janeiro Naval Arsenal (AMRJ) received a new workshop and a floating dock. On 15 July 1986, the keel of Tamoio–the first submarine built in Brazil–was laid. The Navy's goal was to obtain enough know-how to design its own submarines in the future, both conventional and nuclear. The 209 class met the desired technological and operational profile. It was an export success, although it never served in the German navy. In South America alone, it found six other buyers: Argentina, Peru, Colombia, Venezuela, Ecuador and Chile.

In weapons-launching exercises, the IKL-209s sank the hulls of the former destroyers Marcílio Dias, in 1996, and Espírito Santo, in 1999. In May 1997, Tamoio participated with the navies of the North Atlantic Treaty Organization (NATO) in Operation Linked Seas. The Brazilian submarine reached torpedo firing range of the Spanish aircraft carrier Príncipe de Asturias (R-11), the flagship of the opposing naval forces, without being detected by the more than ten frigates and destroyers that served as its escort. By the exercise's rules, Tamoio "sank" the aircraft carrier.The Tikuna would do the same with the American aircraft carrier Carl Vinson (CVN-70) in 2010. The event is not unique; submarines from other navies, such as the Peruvian, German, and Italian ones, have already managed to approach American aircraft carriers in international maneuvers. These episodes also illustrate the continuity of joint exercises with the U.S. Navy. At the beginning of the 21st century, Brazil was the last country on the Atlantic coast of South America to contribute to the training of American submariners.

==== Abandoned plans ====
The technological capabilities developed with the IKL-209 were directed towards a Brazilian project attempt, the National Submarine I (SNAC-I). This program, and its successor in the 1990s–the Brazilian Medium Submarine (SMB-10)–were eventually cancelled and the Navy opted for a foreign project. Negotiations with the German steel company ThyssenKrupp for a conventional IKL-214 submarine were promising in 2005, but the project was not signed. In 2007, Brazil's federal government released new funds, with which a partnership with France would be negotiated to start the Submarine Development Program (ProSub).

=== French origin ===
==== Scorpène/Riachuelo ====
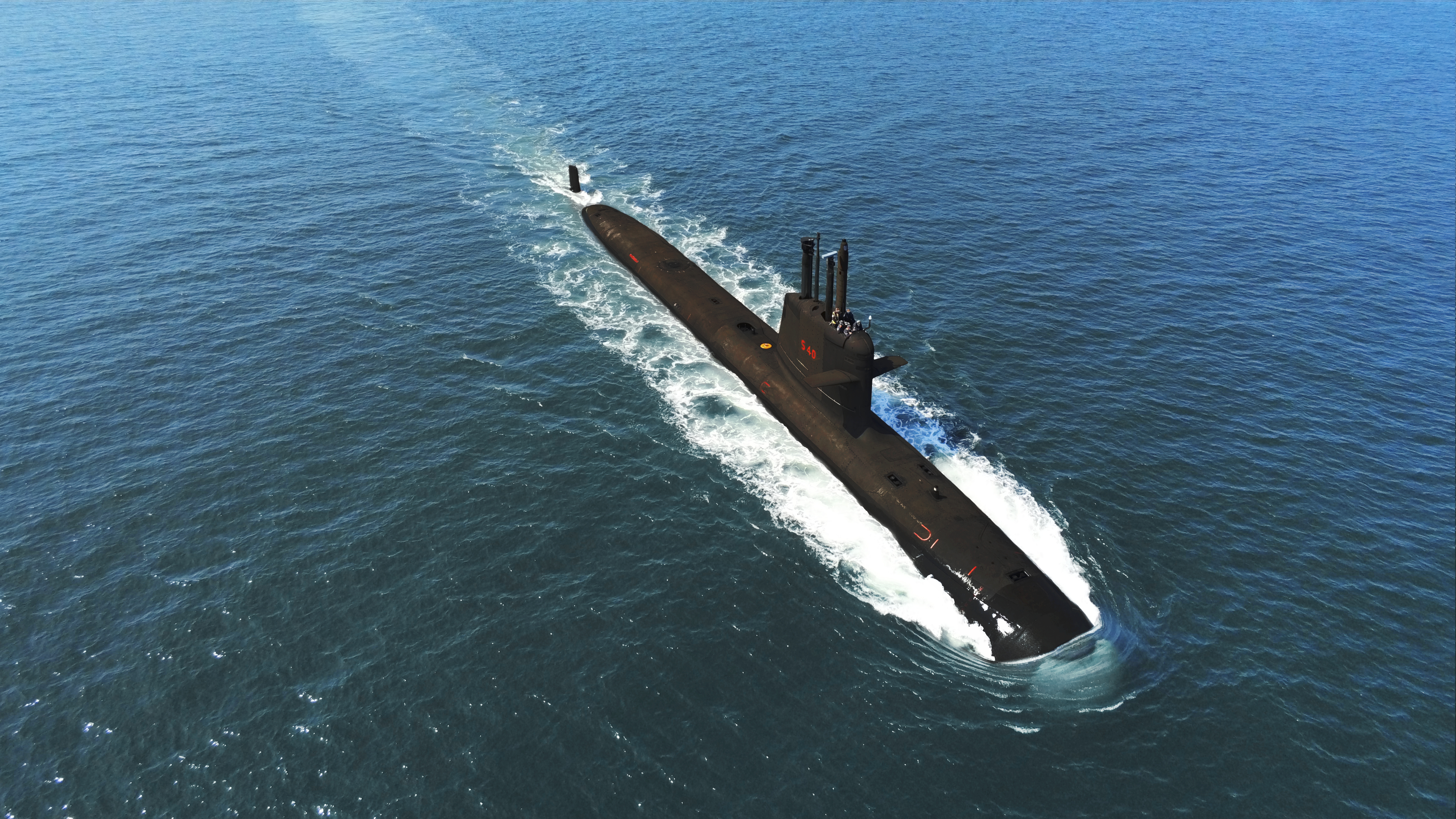
Riachuelo

A class of four submarines–the S Riachuelo (2022–present), S Humaitá (2024–present), S Tonelero (2025–present) and S Almirante Karam (not commissioned yet). Each displaces 1,740 tons on the surface and 1,9 thousand tons submerged, with a crew of 41, a maximum diving depth greater than 250 meters, a top speed of twenty knots, an endurance of 70 and a range of thirteen thousand nautical miles at eight knots (on the surface or with snorkel) or four hundred miles at four knots (with battery power). They are armed with six launch tubes, capable of holding eighteen 21-inch torpedoes, eight Exocet SM39 missiles and/or naval mines, as well as two Contralto-S countermeasures launchers. The deployment of missiles would be an unprecedented capability in the Submarine Force.

The Riachuelo or S-BR class is a larger version of the Scorpène submarines exported to the Chilean, Indian, and Malaysian navies. The Brazilian Navy opted not to include an air-independent propulsion (AIP) system. The former Mectron company was developing a National Heavy Torpedo (TPN) to equip the ProSub submarines, but as of 2018 there had been no further news of the project since 2015. The new submarines received the French F-21 torpedo. Thus, dependence on foreign torpedoes persists. Other areas for which there are, or have been, plans for nationalization include missiles and digital operating systems: the combat management system and the integrated platform management system.

The order for the four submarines and seven other contracts were signed by the Navy's Directorate-General of Materiel in 2009, giving shape to ProSub. This project also includes the transfer of technology to the Brazilian Navy and industry as well as the construction of a naval and industrial complex in Itaguaí, Rio de Janeiro, where the vessels will be assembled, culminating in the launch of a fifth nuclear-powered submarine.

==== Álvaro Alberto ====
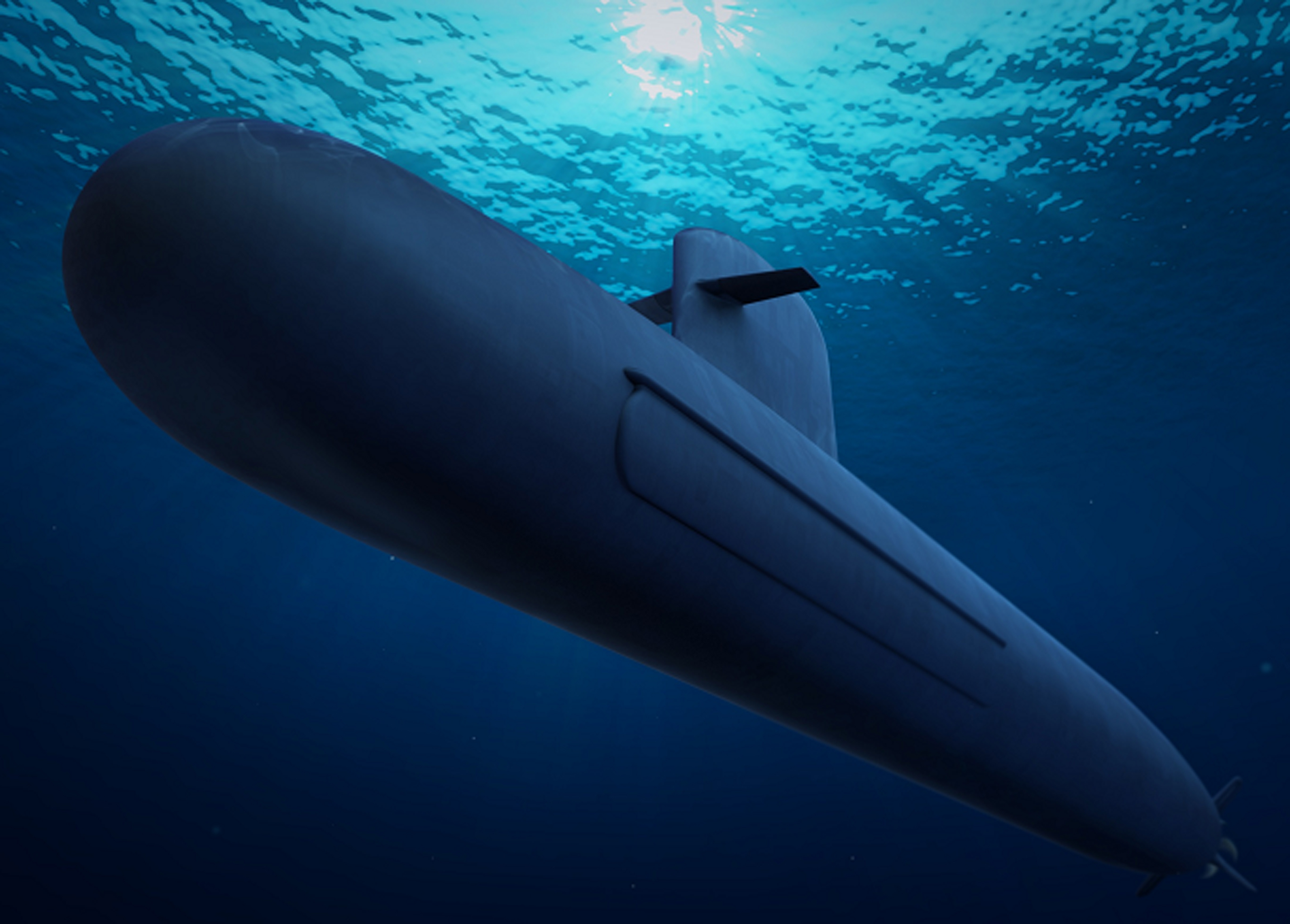
Artist's rendering of the SN-BR

The ultimate goal of ProSub is to build the first Brazilian nuclear submarine (SN-BR), to be named Álvaro Alberto (SN-10). In 2018 it was projected that it would displace six thousand tons on the surface and 6,500 tons submerged, with a range of fifteen thousand miles and no fuel restrictions on its endurance, being able to navigate for as long as its crew can sustain it. The maximum submerged speed, exceeding nineteen knots, does not surpass that of conventional submarines, but it can be maintained over long distances, while the batteries of diesel-electric submarines are consumed in a few hours at top speed. The hull is an enlarged version of the Riachuelo class, with a length exceeding 100 meters, compared to 71.6 meters in the conventional version. Armament would still be conventional; Brazil intends to be the only country not to complement nuclear propulsion with nuclear weapons.

The reactor to be used in the SN-BR and its nuclear fuel will be supplied by the Navy's Nuclear Program. Its success would place Brazil among the select group of countries that operate nuclear submarines–the five permanent members of the United Nations Security Council, plus India. Cuts to the military budget and a redirection of foreign and defense policies froze the project in the 1990s, but it would be resumed with vigor in the following decade, culminating in the 2008 National Defense Strategy, which transformed the nuclear submarine into a national priority.

ProSub is the largest of the Navy's construction programs and a priority for its leadership. Admiral Armando Vidigal noted in 2009 that "the Navy has turned the nuclear submarine into a symbol, and whoever opposes this symbol will encounter serious opposition within the Navy". He himself feared that investments in submarines would come at the expense of other naval platforms. At best, it would induce the renewal of the entire fleet through complementary acquisitions; at worst, it would build "islands of advanced technology in an ocean of obsolete and ineffectual equipment". The 2014 economic crisis delayed the deadlines, but the program survived. In 2024, commissioning of the SN-BR was projected for 2037.
