= Brazilian submarine support ship Ceará =

Brazilian Navy submarine support ship of 1917–1946

- The newly launched Ceará fitting out at Muggiano, La Spezia, Italy, sometime between September 1915 and June 1916.

History

Brazil
- Name: Ceará
- Namesake: Ceará, a state of Brazil
- Builder: FIAT-San Giorgio, La Spezia, Italy
- Laid down: 15 July 1913
- Launched: 7 September 1915
- Completed: 16 October 1916
- Commissioned: 28 April 1917
- Decommissioned: 25 March 1946
- Fate: Scrapped

General characteristics
- Type: Submarine tender, submarine rescue ship, salvage ship, floating drydock, and floating testing facility
- Displacement: 4,196 t (4,130 long tons) (full load)
- Length: 100 m (328 ft 1 in)
- Beam: 15.5 m (50 ft 10 in)
- Draft: 4.2 m (13 ft 9 in) (at full load)
- Depth: 8.2 m (26 ft 11 in)
- Propulsion: 2 × 2,100 hp (1,566 kW) or 2,300 hp (1,715 kW) FIAT-San Giorgio two-stroke, six-cylinder diesel engines, two shafts, 600 t (591 long tons; 661 short tons) diesel fuel
- Speed: 14 knots (26 km/h; 16 mph) (maximum); 10 knots (19 km/h; 12 mph) (cruising)
- Range: 4,000 nmi (7,400 km; 4,600 mi) at 10 knots (19 km/h; 12 mph)
- Complement: 183 or 193
- Armament: Either: 4 x 101 mm (4 in) guns; 4 x 47 mm (1.9 in) Armstrong guns; 2 x 57 mm (2.2 in) Hotchkiss guns; or: 4 x 57 mm (2.2 in) guns; 2 x 7 mm machine guns
- Notes: Accommodation for 130 submarine crewmen

Ceará was a Brazilian Navy multipurpose submarine support ship in commission from 1917 to 1946. Her design allowed her to function as a floating submarine base, serving in the roles of submarine tender, submarine rescue ship, salvage ship, and testing facility for submarine pressure hulls. In 1917, she recovered the sunken Italian submarine F8 without loss of life among F8′s crew.

Ceará was named for the Brazilian state of Ceará. She was the second Brazilian Navy ship to bear the name.

== Design ==
The profile and horizontal and vertical waterlines of Ceará, published in Engineering on 16 June 1916.

Cross-section drawings of Ceará depicting the entrance to her cylindrical basin, her two manual emergency rudders, and her two main diesel engines, published in Engineering on 16 June 1916.

The profile of Ceará with a submarine in her inner cylinder, published in Popular Mechanics in June 1916.

On 17 July 1914, the Brazilian Navy commissioned its first three submarines, the three vessels of the Foca class, also referred to as the F class. Brazil had no facilities large enough to maintain them. Moreover, with the submarines limited to an operational range of about 1,000 nautical miles (1,900 km; 1,200 mi), the Brazilian Navy faced the expensive prospect either of establishing a number of submarine bases along its long coastline to give the three submarines the flexibility to defend the entire coast or — even more expensive — purchasing more submarines to spread out along the coast. The Brazilian government lacked the financial resources to pay for either of these options. To address Brazil's requirement for an affordable way of giving its submarines the ability to operate along the entire coast, the Italian engineer Cesare Laurenti designed Ceará as a multipurpose submarine support vessel with the capability to serve as a floating submarine base, operating as a submarine tender, submarine rescue ship, salvage ship, floating drydock, and floating pressure hull testing facility.

Ceará was built around a watertight cylinder inside her hull which extended for about two-thirds of her length. She had a conventional monohull design at her bow, but about a third of the way aft her hull divided into two parallel catamaran-like hulls with the cylinder between them. A lattice structure above the cylinder joined the two hulls. This design allowed submarines to enter her basin from her stern. The cylinder was 64 metres (210 ft 0 in) long. A submarine entering it first passed through a 5-metre-long (16 ft 5 in) truncated cone segment with a diameter of 7.56 metres (24 ft 10 in) at the entrance at Ceará′s stern. This tapered to a diameter of 7.10 metres (23 ft 4 in) at its forward end. Forward of that was a 42.5-metre-long (139 ft 5 in) cylindrical segment with a diameter of 7.10 metres (23 ft 4 in), and then another truncated cone segment whose diameter at the forward end tapered to 5 metres (16 ft 5 in). The cylinder extended below Ceará′s waterline, and its bottom had fixed keels on which a submarine rested once the cylinder's entrance was closed by a lenticular floating door and the water was pumped out. To launch a submarine back into the water, water was pumped into the cylinder and Ceará′s ballast tanks using two centrifugal pumps, each with a capacity of 300 tonnes (300 long tons; 330 short tons) per hour.

Ceará′s cylinder could be used in two ways. It allowed her to operate as a conventional floating drydock in which a submarine could undergo careening, maintenance, and refits. It also made her the only ship in the world that could serve as a floating facility for testing of the strength and watertight integrity of submarine pressure hulls. To undergo such a test, a submarine entered the cylinder, which then was sealed. Water was pumped into the cylinder to create a water pressure level equivalent to that which a submarine experienced at a depth of up to 60 metres (197 feet). Pressure could be increased gradually and decreased instantly, and the men aboard the submarine undergoing the test maintained constant telephone contact with Ceará′s crew, allowing a test to be terminated at the first sign of any problem with the pressure hull, thus ensuring minimal risk to those aboard the submarine.

Ceará had two powerful cranes, one at the stern of each of the two after hulls, giving her the capability to lift sunken submarines to the surface and to lift intact submarines out of the water to allow inspections of their propellers, rudders, and hull without docking them. Each crane was a 5.18-metre-high (17 ft 0 in) metal lattice structure that could reach up to 5 metres (16 ft 5 in) beyond the transom of her twin after hulls. Each had a capacity of 200 tonnes (197 long tons; 220 short tons) and could lift a weight 36.5 metres (119 ft 9 in) in 30 minutes. To ensure a successful lift, she could be anchored securely fore and aft, and she had ballast tanks forward that could be flooded to keep her trimmed during a lift. She was fully equipped to support divers involved in the lift.

Ceará also was equipped to serve as a submarine tender. While her propulsion system occupied the after third of her twin after hulls, the rest of the ship provided facilities for the support of a squadron of up to six submarines displacing up to 250 tonnes (246 long tons; 276 short tons) each. These included storage space for materials, food, ammunition, and torpedoes for the submarines, a repair shop, and accommodation for up to 130 submarine crewmen. She had two auxiliary diesel engines identical to the engines of the submarines she supported; these not only powered dynamos that recharged the submarines′ batteries, but also allowed engine room crews from the submarines to receive training aboard Ceará in the operation and maintenance of the engines aboard their submarines. Ceará had three air compressors which recharged the submarines' compressed air tanks and torpedo cylinders, as well as a refrigeration system and a drinking water distiller with a capacity of 200 litres (53 US gal; 44 imp gal) per hour. Ceará carried enough diesel fuel, provisions, ammunition, torpedoes, and spare parts to fully resupply six submarines four times each, as well as supply them with potable water, distilled water, allowing them to operate for extended periods without having to return to port.

One of Ceará's main diesel engines.

Ceará′s propulsion system consisted of two FIAT-San Giorgio two-stroke, six-cylinder diesel engines. The most powerful diesel engines installed in a ship at the time of Ceará′s construction — each of them was rated at either 2,100 hp (1,566 kW) or 2,300 hp (1,715 kW), according to different sources — they were smaller and lighter than similar four-stroke engines. They drove Ceará's two propellers, with one engine and its associated propeller shaft and propeller in each of her twin hulls; each hull also had a rudder and a manually operated emergency rudder. Each engine was 9.3 metres (30 ft 6 in) long, 5 metres (16 ft 5 in) tall, and 3 metres (9 ft 10 in) wide and weighed 160 tonnes (157 long tons; 176 short tons). They gave her a maximum speed of 14 knots (26 km/h; 16 mph) and an economical cruising speed of 10 knots (18.5 km/h; 11.5 mph). Although diesel engines were smaller, lighter, and used less fuel than steam engines and eventually would become common in ship design, in the early 20th century ship designers and operators viewed them as having questionable reliability compared to steam engines, and their use in Ceará was a novelty at the time. However, Laurenti convinced the Brazilian Navy of the advantages of using them in Ceará. With a full load of 600 tonnes (591 long tons; 661 short tons) of fuel aboard, she had a range of 4,000 nautical miles (7,400 km; 4,600 mi) at 10 knots (18.5 km/h; 11.5 mph).

Sources disagree on Ceará′s dimensions; one claims her displacement was 4,196 tonnes (4,130 long tons; 4,625 short tons) at full load and that she was 100 metres (328 ft 1 in) long, with a beam of 15.5 metres (50 ft 10 in) and a draft of 4.2 metres (13 ft 9 in) at full load, while another asserts that her standard displacement was 3,500 tons, that her displacement was 5,740 tons at full load, and that she was 101.30 metres (332 ft 4 in) long, with a beam of 15.75 metres (51 ft 8 in) and a draft of 6.0 metres (19 ft 8 in).

Ceará was armed to defend herself from enemy destroyers and torpedo boats, but sources disagree on her armament. One states that it consisted of four 101 mm (4 in) guns, four 47 mm (1.9 in) Armstrong guns, and two 57 mm (2.2 in) Hotchkiss guns, and another that it consisted only of four 57 mm (2.2 in) guns and two 7 mm (0.3 in) machine guns. Another source lists her armament as consisting of four 101 mm (4 in) guns, two 57 mm (2.2 in) guns, two 47 mm (1.9 in) guns, and two 13.2 mm (0.5 in) Hotchkiss machine guns.

Sources also disagree on the size of Ceará′s crew. One claims it totaled 183 men, while another asserts that it consisted of 17 officers and 176 enlisted personnel.

== Construction ==
Ceará is launched at the FIAT-San Giorgio shipyard at Muggiano, La Spezia, Italy, on 7 September 1915.

The FIAT-San Giorgio shipyard at Muggiano, La Spezia, Italy, laid down Ceará on 15 July 1913. She was launched on 7 September 1915.

== Service history ==
Ceará was handed over to the Brazilian Navy on 16 October 1916. She departed La Spezia on 15 November 1916 bound for Genoa, Italy, which she reached the same day. She met her Brazilian crew at Genoa and began a process of training and workups in Italy before making her delivery voyage to Brazil.

Ceará′s departure for Brazil was imminent when on 14 February 1917 the new Italian Regia Marina (Royal Navy) submarine F8, which had been in commission for only 12 days, sank off La Spezia during workups because of a maneuvering error. F8 came to rest on the seabed 2 nautical miles (3.7 km; 2.3 mi) south of the island of Tino at a depth of 30 metres (98 feet). Her crew survived, but was trapped aboard F8. With Ceará nearby, the Italian government requested assistance from Brazil. Ceará suspended preparations for her delivery voyage and proceeded to the scene, where she raised F8 to the surface within 24 hours of the sinking and without casualties among F8′s crew.

Ceará in port in Brazil, ca. 1942. The cranes at her stern — rendered obsolete by the growth in size of submarines since her commissioning — have been removed.

Ceará got underway from La Spezia on 20 February 1917 to begin her delivery voiyage to Brazil, bound for Rio de Janeiro. During the 6,000-nautical-mile (11,000 km; 6,900 mi) voyage, her diesel engines consumed 2,390 tons of fuel and performed flawlessly despite her crew's lack of experience in operating them and the presence aboard of only one engineer certified by the shipyard to maintain them. She arrived at Rio de Janeiro on 19 April 1917 and was commissioned into Brazilian Navy service on 28 April 1917. She became the flagship of the commander of the Brazilian Navy's submarine flotilla, who also commanded Brazil's submarine base and submarine school at Recife. Recife became her base.

As submarines grew in size, they became too large for Ceará′s cranes to lift. Eventually, the two cranes were removed.

Brazil entered World War II (1939–1945) on the side of the Allies on 22 August 1942. Ceará maintained a very active schedule during the war, operating alongside other Brazilian Navy ships and ships of the United States Navy's Fourth Fleet in training Allied convoy escort forces.

== Disposal ==
Ceará was decommissioned on 25 March 1946. She subsequently was scrapped.
