= Tonelero =

Tonelero is a Spanish word meaning barrel builder (tonel meaning barrel) or Cooper.

Tonelero may also refer to:

== History ==
- Battle of The Tonelero Pass, a battle fought on 17 December 1851, during the Platine War, between the Argentine Confederation Army and the Empire of Brazil Navy.

== Places ==
- El Tonelero, a rural area in Ramallo over the Paraná River, north east of Buenos Aires Provnince, Argentina.
  - Paso del Tonelero (Spanish: The Tonelero Pass), area where the Battle of The Tonelero Pass was fought.
- Rua Tonelero, the name of a street located in the neighborhood of Copacabana in the city of Rio de Janeiro, Brazil.

== Ships ==
- Brazilian submarine Tonelero (S21), an Oberon-class submarine in the Brazilian Navy.
- Brazilian submarine Tonelero (S42), a Scorpène-class submarine expected to enter service with the Brazilian Navy in 2020.
