= Foca-class submarine (Brazil) =

First class of submarines operated by the Brazilian Navy

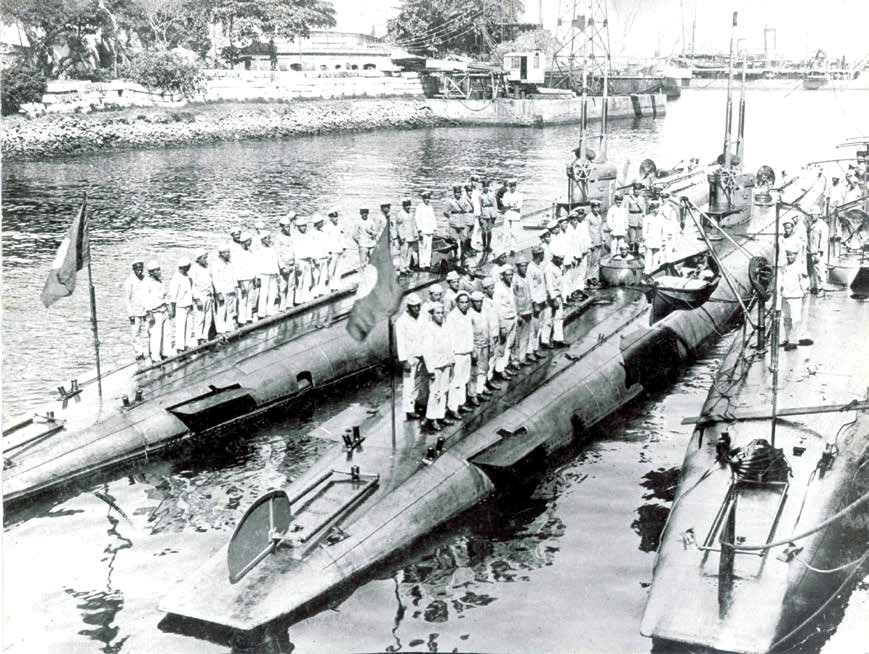
- The three Foca-class submarines with their respective crews

Class overview
- Name: Foca class
- Builders: Fiat-Sant Giorgio Shipyard
- Operators: Brazilian Navy
- Succeeded by: Humaytá
- Built: 1912–1913
- In service: 1914–1933
- Completed: 3
- Scrapped: 3

General characteristics (as built)
- Type: Submarine
- Displacement: 250 t (246 long tons) (surfaced); 370 t (364 long tons) (submerged)
- Length: 45.15 m (148 ft 2 in)
- Beam: 4.20 m (13 ft 9 in)
- Installed power: 625 hp (466 kW) (diesels); 520 hp (390 kW) (electric motors)
- Propulsion: diesel-electric; 2 × diesel engines; 2 × electric motors
- Speed: 14.8 knots (27.4 km/h; 17.0 mph) (surfaced); 9 knots (17 km/h; 10 mph) (submerged)
- Range: 1,685 nmi (3,121 km; 1,939 mi) at 8.5 knots (15.7 km/h; 9.8 mph) (surfaced); 100 nmi (190 km; 120 mi) at 4.5 knots (8.3 km/h; 5.2 mph) (submerged)
- Test depth: 40 m (130 ft)
- Complement: 23
- Armament: 2 × 450 mm (18 in) torpedo tubes

The Foca class, or simply F, was the first class of submarines operated by the Brazilian Navy. It consisted of the submarines F1, F3 and F5, designed by Italian naval engineer Cesare Laurenti and built in La Spezia, Italy. The name Foca comes from the Portuguese vessel of the class. The class was part of Brazil's 1906 naval program to acquire warships to modernize its navy. The submarines were acquired to serve as a training and maintenance platform for the crews, with few naval actions during the 19 years they were active. The navy incorporated the class on 17 July 1914 and, as a result, expanded its naval structure to house these new vessels, such as the creation of the first naval school for submariners and the incorporation of ships designed to support submarines only.

The Brazilian Navy was outdated in a period when the country wanted to be among the world powers of the time. At first, the acquisition of submarine means was left aside, as the government prioritized the incorporation of large steel ships, such as the Minas Geraes-class battleships. With the initiative of several officers in the internal development of submersible prototypes and the inclusion of this discussion in the press, the Brazilian government began to analyze this naval medium as well, with the first attempt to acquire it in 1894, when a contract was signed with the French engineer Claude Goubet, but the project did not advance. It was not until 1910 that the government actually ordered its submarines from the Italian Fiat-Sant Giorgio shipyard. The three submarines mostly served on the coast of Rio de Janeiro state with a single record outside that area a visit to the port of Santos in 1914.

During the First World War, submarines contributed to the surveillance of the port of Rio de Janeiro. From that period on, the class participated in events related to the Independence Award, an award given by the navy to the ships that had the most hits of targets with torpedoes, which the vessels of this class were awarded several times. During the training commissions, there were incidents, some more serious than others, that took the submarines to the bottom of Guanabara Bay. On one occasion, the F5 had a rupture in the air intake valve that caused the submarine to dive out of control several times, forcing the crew to perform a maneuver that, if not done correctly, was potentially fatal.

The Foca class allowed Brazil to develop the notion of submarine warfare, which was evidenced by the constant acquisitions of these naval assets throughout the country's naval history. More than 20 submarines were commissioned after the Focas, with the most recent being commissioned in the late 2010s and early 2020s. In the 21st century, the submarine environment is the sector in which the Brazilian Navy invests the most among all departments under its jurisdiction.

== Characteristics ==
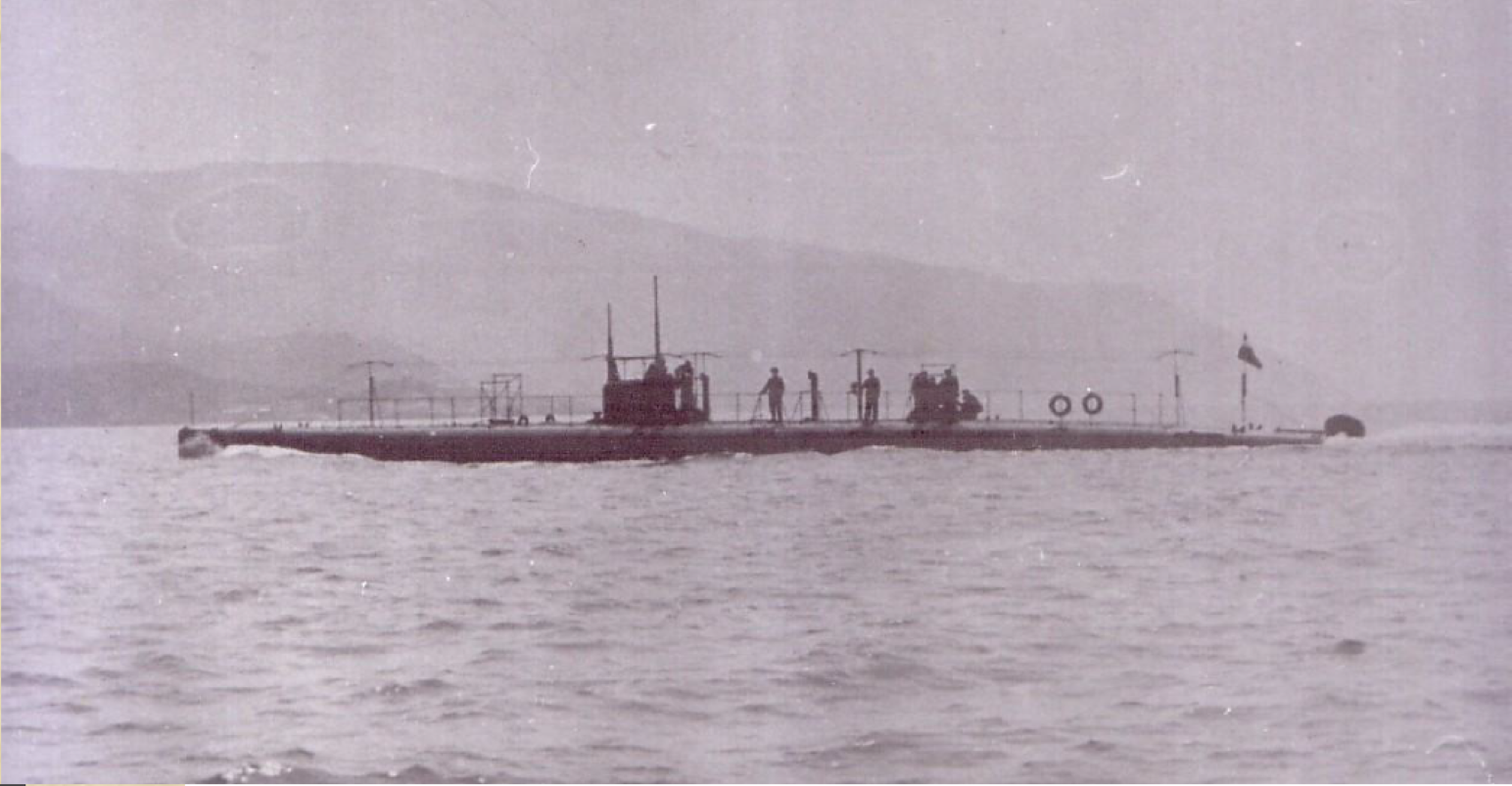
F1, unknown date

The Brazilian submarines measured 45.15 meters (148 ft 2 in) in length; had a beam of 4.20 m (13 ft 9 in); 3 m (9 ft 10 in) of draft; displaced 250 to 370 tonnes (250 to 360 long tons); travelled at a speed of 14.8 knots (27.4 km/h; 17.0 mph) on the surface and 9 knots (17 km/h; 10 mph) when submergedl; had a freeboard height of 1.15 m (3 ft 9 in); a range of 1,685 nautical miles (3,121 km; 1,939 mi) at 8.5 knots (15.7 km/h; 9.8 mph) on the surface and 100 nautical miles (190 km; 120 mi) at 4.5 knots (8.3 km/h; 5.2 mph) submerged; a test depth of 40 meters (130 ft), with a crew of 23 men, out of which two officers. (Note: Another source claims the submarines measured 42.5 m (139 ft 5 in) in length, 2.6 m (8 ft 6 in) in draft and had a speed of 16 knots (30 km/h; 18 mph) on the surface.) Their armament consisted of two 450 mm torpedo tubes, located at the bow. They had two one-metre (3 ft 3 in) collapsible periscopes. The propulsion system was of the alternative type. There were two diesel engines of 350 horsepower (260 kW) each; two electric motors of 260 hp (190 kW) each and batteries with 240 elements of two thousand amperes of capacity and with a discharge rate of ten hours. The steering was manually controlled, consisting of a double vertical rudder and two horizontal rudders.

They were equipped, according to the historical extract of the submarines in the collection of the Directorate of the Historic Heritage and Documentation of the Brazilian Navy, with "lead ballast keel and bowline, four ballast tanks of 46 tons each, a compensation tank of 4.8 tons, two trimming tanks of 0.8 tons each, two fuel oil tanks, internal to the liquid fuel oil of 11 tons, two lubricating oil tanks of 0.98 tons each, a torpedo compensation tank of 1.8 tons and two reserve torpedo buffer tanks of 0.65 tons each'. The submarine's Marconi-type radiotelegraphic system consisted of a pneumatic bell transmitter and four receiver phones, with a power of 0.2 kilowatt and a maximum range of 30 miles.

== History ==
=== Background ===
At the end of the 19th century, the Brazilian Navy was outdated, with old ships in a poor state of conservation. During the Campos Sales government, Brazil, with a rural population and an agrarian economy, began to grow economically, due to the good prices of the coffee and rubber markets and the increase in their exports. At that time, a large portion of the country's population was in poverty, but the elites had access to the technological innovations that existed in Europe. It was during this period that Brazil sought to become part of the select group of so-called modern nations.

In the naval milieu, it was almost a consensus that the best navies owned the most powerful steel battleships. The young elite who studied in Europe brought to Brazil this same view, which hovered in the naval command of the country. Submersible means were left out of the national plan for the re-equipment of the Brazilian fleet. Even so, there were officers who strongly defended the acquisition and development of submarines, as they saw the great potential that this naval medium offered, a vision that already existed in the main navies of the world.

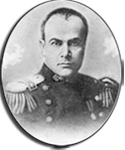
Felinto Perry, one of the first promoters of the inclusion of submarines in the Brazilian Navy

The navy lieutenant Felinto Perry, started a campaign in 1891 to promote submersible means in the country. His writings in the press promoted the debate in the naval environment about the inclusion of this type of vessel in the refitting plan. The navy's high command and politicians began to analyze this demand. The first official movement in favor of the acquisition of submarines took place in 1894, when the Brazilian government signed a contract with French engineer Claude Goubet for the construction of an 8-meter-long submarine that would be manned by crews from the battleship Riachuelo, which was in France at that time, for modernization, but the construction did not happen, due to the non-fulfillment of the contract by the French engineer.

Some Brazilian officers began to develop their own projects, such as the submarine model of navy officer Luís Jacinto Gomes. The project took about 20 years to develop and, after successful tests in 1901, the navy decided to produce it at the Rio de Janeiro Navy Arsenal, but construction did not proceed due to the lack of funds. Luís de Mello Marques, a former officer, designed a modified submarine based on the American Holland class. The most promising project was that of naval engineer and lieutenant Emílio Júlio Hess who built, in 1905, a model with his innovative Hess Boiler, a steam engine technology that unified surface and immersion navigation modes. This project was the one that best demonstrated how the submarines could be used as a weapon of war. Like its predecessors, the plan was not completed.

Finally, starting in 1904, the Brazilian Navy decided to launch a broad program to modernize its fleet. Projects were drawn up for the acquisition of large warships that would make the country a naval power. The 1906 plan, headed by Admiral Alexandrino Faria de Alencar, was responsible for the acquisition of two Dreadnought-type battleships, two cruisers, ten destroyers and a few other smaller ships. The plan also included the purchase of three submarines ordered from Italy that would be the first to operate in the country. In Brazil, the submarines were called F1, F3 and F5, forming the Foca class.

=== Construction ===
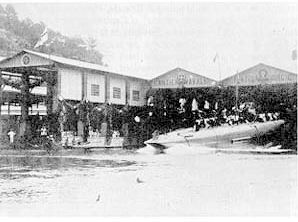
Launch of the F1 in 1913

The Foca class was developed by Italian naval engineer Cesare Laurenti, who was also the creator of Italy's first submarine, Delfino. Originally, the construction of submarines was intended only for Brazil, which had ordered them in 1910. The vessels were built at the Fiat-Sant Giorgio shipyards, in La Spezia, and were an improved version of the Italian Medusa class, with modifications to the command turret and improvements for faster submersion. It was an export version with the nomenclature F to designate them. Delivery to Brazil began in 1913. The F1 was laid down on March 23 and launched on June 11, with the submarine being received by Brazil on December 11. The F3 was laid down on 1 June 1912 and launched on 9 November 1913, being received on 16 March 1914. The F5 was launched on 4 January 1914, being received in June 6. All Brazilian submarines were commissioned on 17 July 1914.

Due to the beginning of the First World War, the Italian government decided to acquire new submarines and took advantage of the already developed Foca submarines. The Italian F-class submarines F1 to F21 were built in the FIAT-San Giorgio, Odero, and Orlando shipyards between 1915 and 1918. Portugal acquired three Italian F-class submarines, which in Portuguese Navy service were also called the Foca class: Foca, Golfinho, and Hidra, commissioned in 1917. Finally, Spain commissioned three other Italian F-class submarines, also in 1917 — Narciso Monturiol, Cosme Garcia, and A-3 — which served in the Spanish Navy as the A class.

=== Service ===
The submarines F1, F3 and F5 began to arrive in the Brazil in 1914, being commissioned on July 17 of that year. The vessels were subordinated to the command of Felinto Perry, who had personally supervised their construction. July 17 was the date of creation of the Submersible Flotilla, composed of the Foca class and subordinated to the Mobile Defense Command, based on Mocanguê island in Niterói. The Foca-class submarines basically served as a learning platform in the handling and maintenance of the vessels by their crew, with the commissions being restricted to the Guanabara Bay, Ilha Grande Bay, and in the areas of Cabo Frio and São Sebastião, always with surface ships support. As far as is known, the only port outside of this region where the class was active was in a visit to the port of Santos. Also in 1914, the Independence Award was created, authored by lieutenant captain Alberto Lemos Basto, which rewarded vessels that had the highest number of torpedo hits in a test, with the Foca class being awarded with some too.

The following year, in 1915, the first group of submarine officers was formed in the country. Two years later, the Submersible Flotilla gained the support of the submarine support ship Ceará, a ship capable of operating as a submarine tender, submarine rescue ship, salvage ship, and floating testing facility which offered mobile support for repairs, maintenance, supply of torpedoes and ammunition, electricity, compressed air, fuel, drinking and distilled water, spare parts, and crew accommodations. It was the only Brazilian Navy ship that allowed a Foca-class submarine to be docked for testing and repairs. However, there are no records of this ever occurring throughout the class's entire period of activity. On the occasion of the World WarI, the submarines were assigned to patrols along the Brazilian coast off Rio de Janeiro, with the only incident being the near collision of F1 with the merchant ship Gurupy.

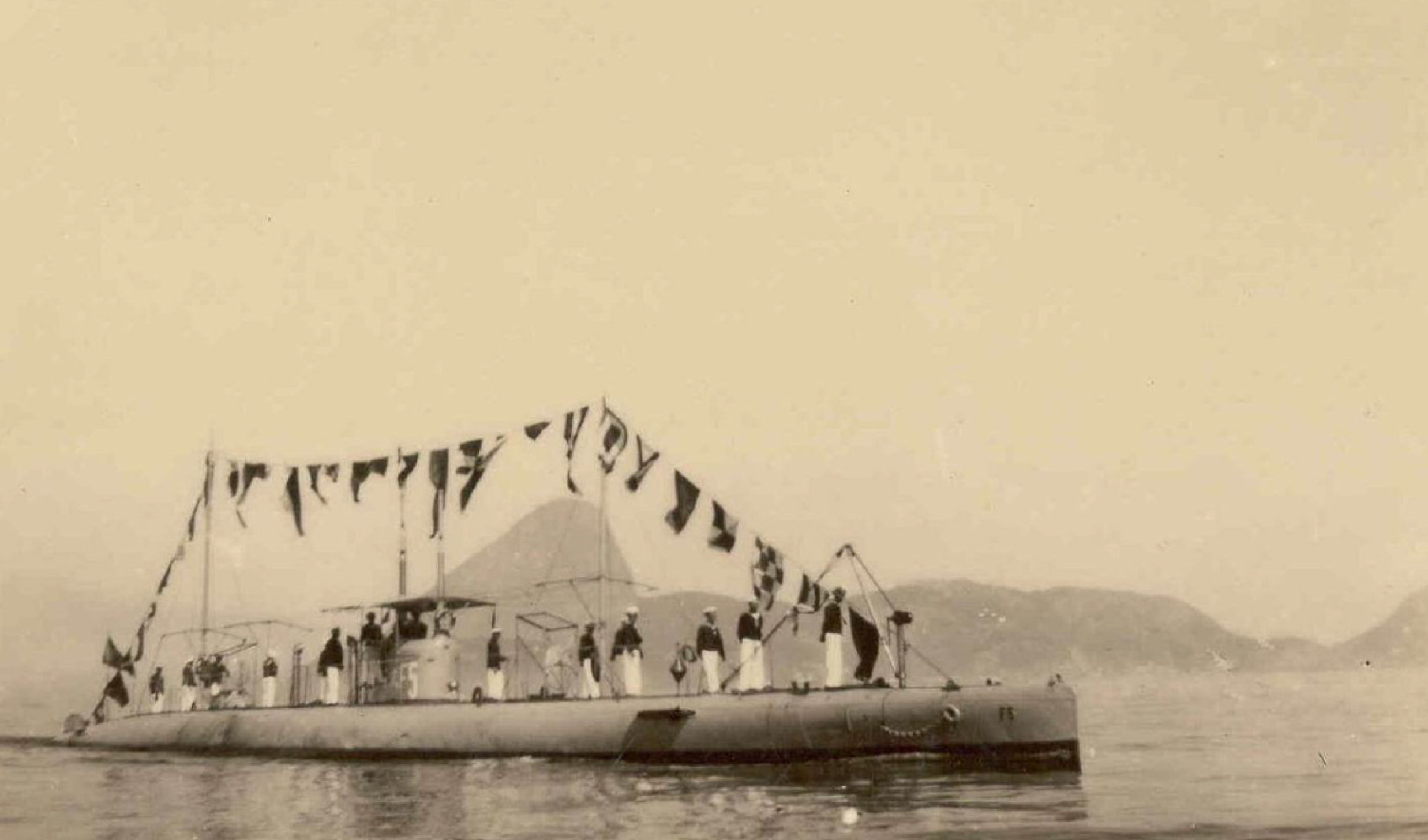
Submarine F5 dressed overall, unknown date

Between 1917 and 1928, the submarines worked regularly on their commissions, obtaining the Independence Award in 1917, 1918, and 1922. In this last year, the F3, while training to compete for the award, suffered an incident of horizontal stability, with no harm to the crew. The following year, the F5 suffered a serious immersion accident, when the sewage valve leaked, causing salt water to flood one of its compartments, taking the submersible to the bottom of Guanabara Bay and remaining there for a while at a depth of 23 meters (75 ft). The crew managed to return to the surface shortly thereafter. In 1924, the F5 was among the vessels deployed by the Brazilian government to attack the rebellious battleship São Paulo, making three dives and being in combat readiness, but there were no records of shots against the ship. In 1928, the name of the flotilla was changed to Submarine Flotilla. The following year, the submarine S Humaytá, also built in Italy, was added to the flotilla.

In April 1933, an incident occurred with the F1. After having navigated submerged for two hours in Guanabara Bay, ten meters (33 ft) deep, the commander of the submarine, Lieutenant Captain Mattoso Maia, ordered the submarine to surface, and she reached two meters (6 ft 7 in) below the surface. However, the submarine did not complete the maneuver and descended again, stabilizing at ten meters deep. Despite all attempts to surface, the vessel repeated the same maneuver twice more, climbing to two meters before returning to ten meters below surface. It was thought some pipe had a rupture or poor sealing in the air intake valve which compromised the surfacing maneuver, which proved to be the case when the incident was later investigated. The crew decided to abandon the electric bilge pumps, a dangerous act in the situation they were in since any malfunction in the procedure would result in a fatal accident, and managed to get the submarine safely to the surface. In the same year, Ministerial Notice No. 4,232, of November 18, was issued, ordering the decommissioning of the three submarines, which ended with the display of disarmament and a parade of the crew in salute on December 30. The submarine's hulls served as the foundation for the pillars of the Escaleres Bridge of the Naval School on Villegagnon Island, in Rio de Janeiro.

== Legacy ==
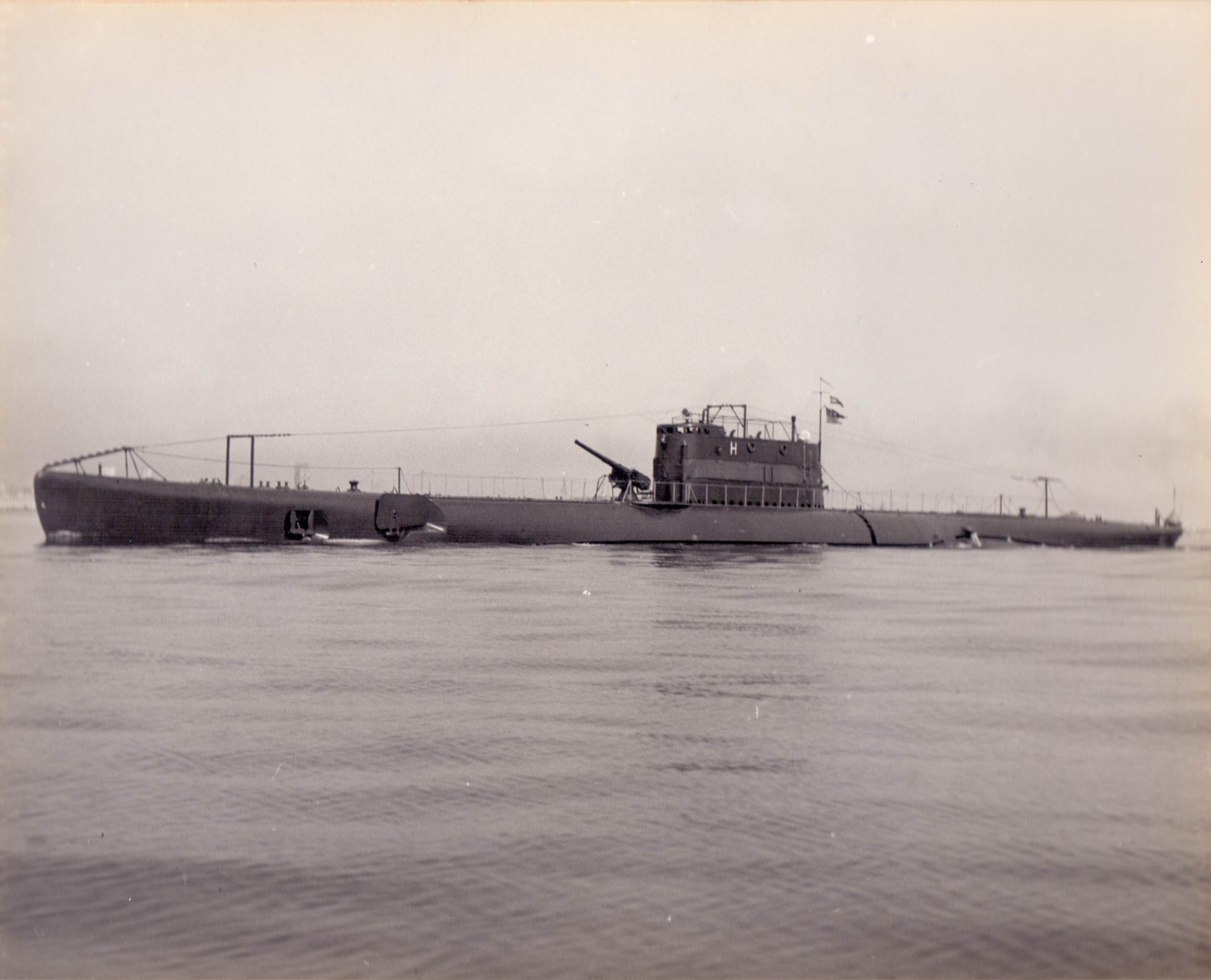
S Humaytá (H)

The incorporation of the submarines F1, F3 and F5 began the operation of submarines in Brazil. Despite being modest, these submarines allowed for the learning of operating and driving techniques that would guide the training of future submariners. The date of incorporation of these vessels, July 17, was chosen to celebrate the Submariner's Day in the Brazilian Navy. The acquisition of the Foca class was the gateway for the country to join the group of nations that saw the military potential of submarines, which proved to be correct given the success of German submarines in the two world wars. In addition, the arrival of the first submarines promoted a broad change in the Brazilian naval structure. In 1915, the first naval school was built for submarine officers, being instructed by the Foca-class submarine commanders themselves. The following year, the permanent Submersible Base appeared, which replaced the mobile base. The construction of these submarines was supervised by Brazilian engineers. Parallel to the instruction of submariners on the techniques for handling the vessel, the arrival of submarines also promoted the development of diving, with the first diving course being held in 1914.

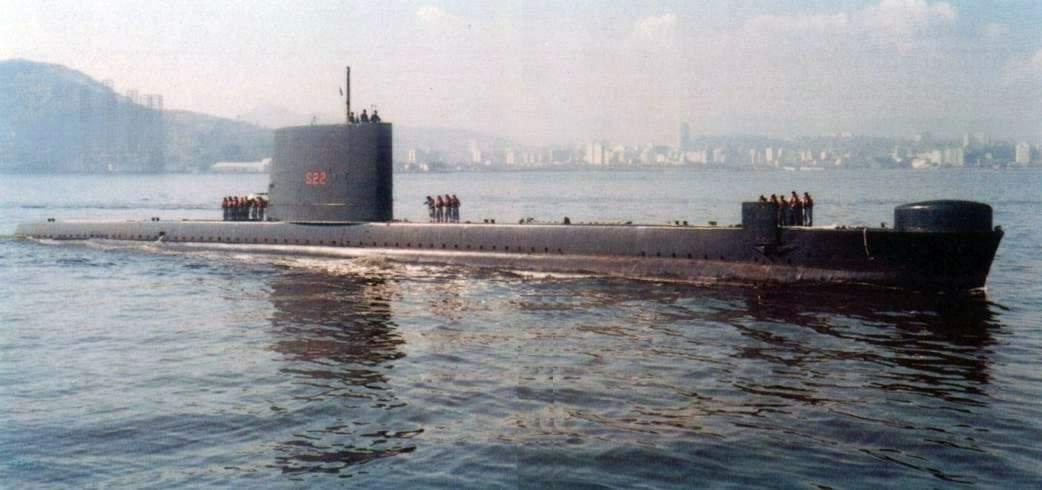
S Riachuelo (S-22)

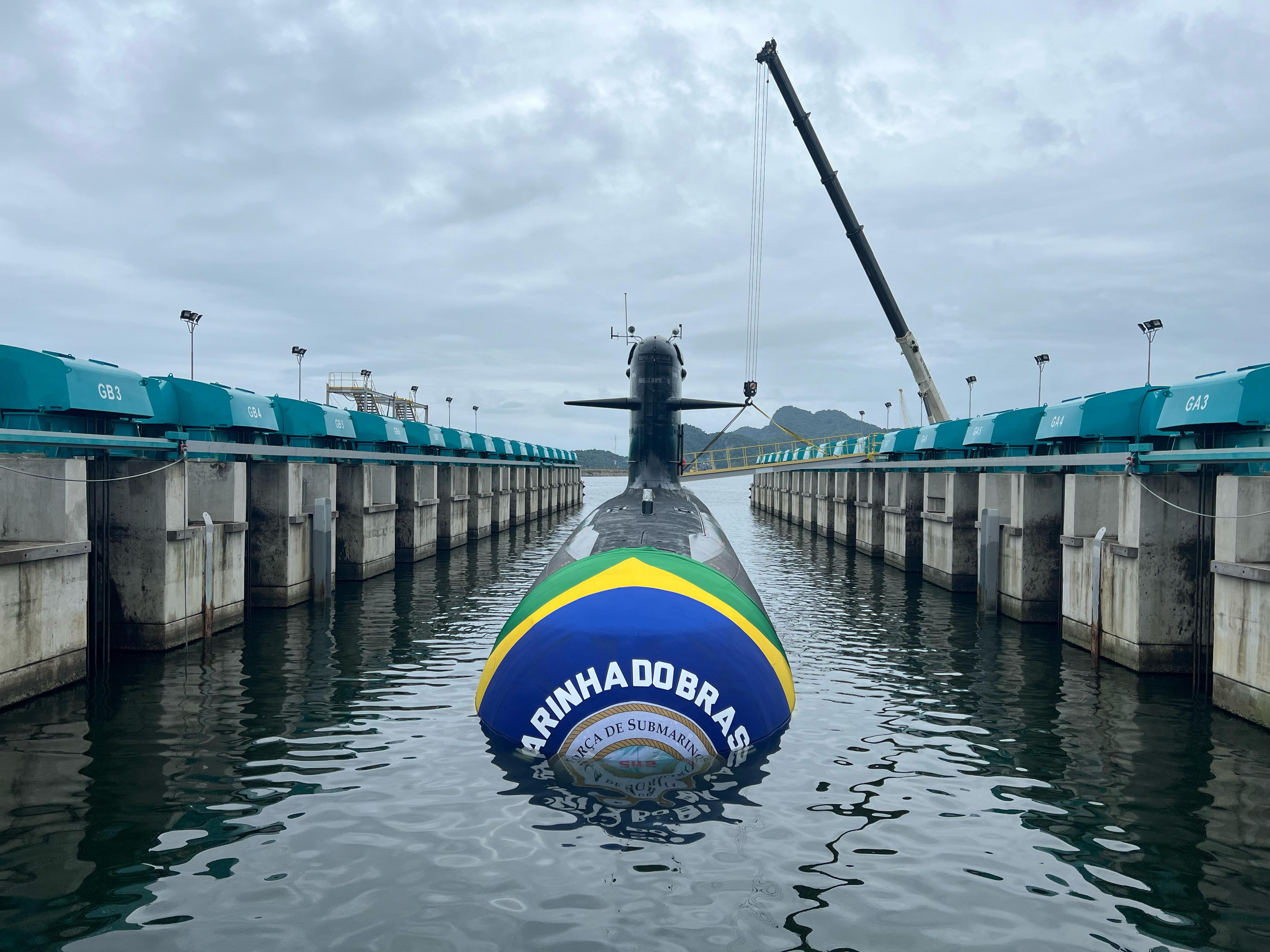
S Tonelero (S-41), the newest submarine operated by the Brazilian Navy

A few years after the incorporation of the three Foca-class submarines, Brazil began a new program of submarine acquisitions, starting in 1929 with the purchase of another Italian submarine, the Humaytá, considered to be a large vessel by the standards of the time, which operated in the Brazilian Navy until 1950. This was followed by the acquisition of Perla-class submarines, also Italian, which in Brazil were called the T class: Tupy, Tymbira and Tamoyo. These submarines had an intense role in World War II in the training of convoy escorts and anti-submarine tactics for surface units and aircraft. In 1955, the corvette Imperial Marinheiro was incorporated into the Submarine Flotilla to replace the already outdated Ceará as a submarine rescue ship. In 1957, the submarines Humaitá (S-14) and Riachuelo (S-15), which operated in the United States Navy during the World War II, were incorporated and, in 1963, Rio Grande do Sul (S-11) and Bahia (S-12), also from the United States. In that year, the flotilla became known as the Submarine Force. From the 1970s onwards, the Submarine Force began to include Guanabara-class submarines, also from the U.S. fleet, and finally the Oberon-class (named the Humaitá class in Brazil) submarines purchased from the United Kingdom.

In the early 1980s, Brazil launched a program for the local construction of submarines, inaugurated by the Tupi class, the result of a contract signed with the German consortium Ferrostaal/HDW, which enabled the local construction of submarines based on the IKL-209-1400-class. In 2006, Brazil built the Tikuna (S-34), also based on this class. Finally, in 2008, the Brazilian Navy Submarine Development Program was created, with the aim of protecting the Brazilian coast, the so-called "Blue Amazon" and its potential resources. From this program, four conventional submarines will be launched, Riachuelo (S-40), Humaitá (S-41), Tonelero (S-42) and Angostura (S-43), based on the French Scorpène class and a nuclear one, Álvaro Alberto (SN-10), the first of its kind to be operated in the Brazil. The Foca submarines, despite having a limited capacity, and which, at the time, displeased admiral Alexandrino de Alencar, were responsible for introducing the notion of submarine warfare in the Brazilian Navy, which was evidenced by the constant acquisition of submarines after their incorporation, which is why, in the 21st century, it is the area that receives most of the institution's resources.
