= Cesare Laurenti =

Cesare Laurenti may refer to:

- Cesare Laurenti (engineer), Italian designer of naval craft
- Cesare Laurenti (painter) (1854–1936), Italian artist
