= Brazilian submarine Tonelero (S21) =

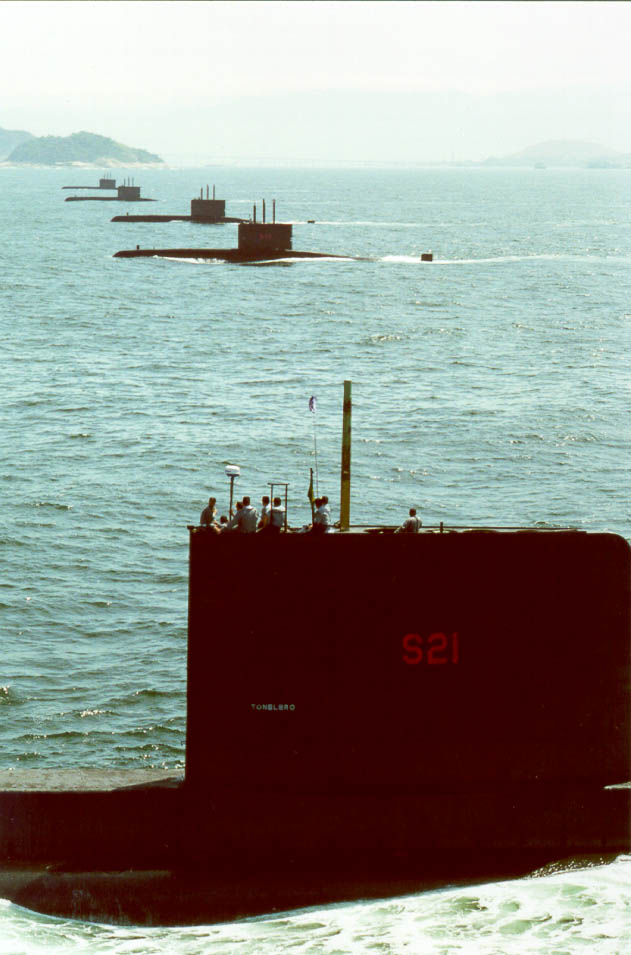
- The brazilian submarine Tonelero in foreground

History

Brazil
- Name: Tonelero
- Namesake: Battle of the Tonelero Pass
- Builder: Vickers Shipbuilding and Engineering, Barrow, England
- Laid down: 18 November 1971
- Launched: 22 November 1972
- Commissioned: 10 December 1977
- Decommissioned: 21 June 2001
- Refit: 1995
- Fate: Scrapped in 2004

General characteristics
- Class & type: Oberon-class submarine
- Displacement: 2,030 long tons (2,060 t) surfaced; 2,410 long tons (2,450 t) submerged
- Length: 295 ft 3 in (89.99 m)
- Beam: 26 ft 6 in (8.08 m)
- Draught: 18 ft (5.5 m)
- Installed power: 2 × electric generators, 2560 kW
- Propulsion: 2 × Admiralty Standard Range 16WS-ASR diesels, 3,680 bhp; 2 × electric motors, 6,000 shp; 2 shafts
- Speed: 12 knots (22 km/h; 14 mph) surfaced; 17 kn (31 km/h; 20 mph) submerged
- Range: 9,000 nautical miles (17,000 km; 10,000 mi) at 12 kn (22 km/h; 14 mph) surfaced
- Complement: 6 officers, 64 ratings
- Armament: 8 × 21 in (533 mm) torpedo tubes (6 bow, 2 stern)

Tonelero (S21) was an Oberon-class submarine in the Brazilian Navy.

== Design and construction ==
The submarine, built by Vickers Shipbuilding and Engineering at their shipyard in Barrow, was laid down on 18 November 1971, and launched on 22 November 1972. During construction, a fire seriously damaged the submarine. The submarine was towed to Chatham Dockyard, where the 60-foot (18 m) central section was cut out and replaced. The fire was found to have originated in the cabling, and prompted the recabling of all under-construction Oberons. She was commissioned into the Brazilian Navy on 10 December 1977.

== Decommissioning and fate ==
Tonelero was listed as active in the 1998-99 edition of Jane's Fighting Ships.

On 26 December 2000, the Tonelero sank at her mooring in the Rio de Janeiro navy yards due to crew error. All 9 crew members aboard escaped from the submarine.

== See also ==
- Ships of the Brazilian Navy

== Bibliography ==
- Scheina, Robert L. & Smigielski, Adam (1995). "Brazil". In Chumbley, Stephen (ed.). Conway's All the World's Fighting Ships, 1947–1995 (revised ed.). Naval Institute Press. pp. 29–36. ISBN 1-55750-132-7.
