= Horace See =

American engineer

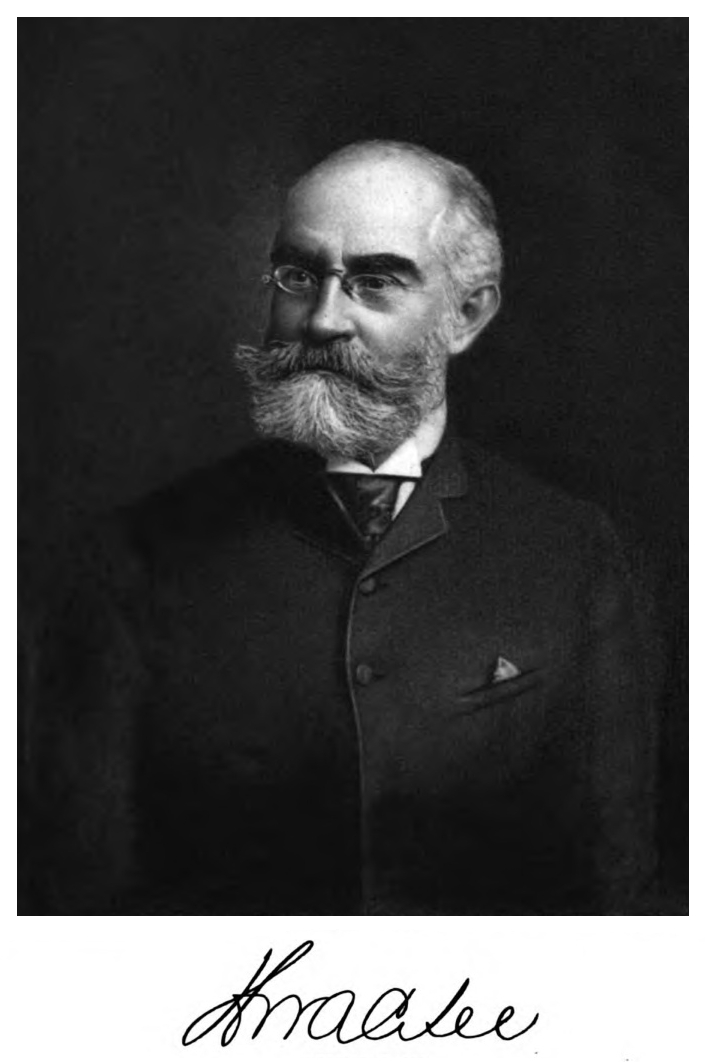
Horace See (1835-1909)

Horace See (Philadelphia, July 16, 1835 - New York City, December 14, 1909) was an American mechanical engineer, marine engineer, naval architect, inventor, and superintendent. He is known as principal naval architect at the William Cramp & Sons shipyard in Philadelphia, and as president of the American Society of Mechanical Engineers in the year 1888–89.

See is also known for his contribution to "bringing triple and quadruple expansion engines to the United States and for making significant improvements in their operation."

== Biography ==
See was born in Philadelphia in 1835, son of the well-known silk importer R. Calhoun See. He received classical and mathematical education at the Episcopal Academy and the private school of H. D. Gregory. He started his career as regular apprentice in the Port Richmond Iron Foundry, Machine and Steam Boiler Shop, I.P. Morris & Co. After the completion of his apprenticeship he became chief draughtsman, and later superintending engineer at Neafie & Levy, and next superintendent with the National Iron Armor and Shipbuilding Company.

In 1868 See joined George Snyder Machine Works in Philadelphia as engineer and assistant superintendent, he designed and constructed the machinery for the Lehigh and Susquehanna planes at Wilkesbarre, and the hoisting and pumping machinery for many of the prominent anthracite coal mines. After his service in the Civil War, 1m 1871 he started building iron vessels at William Cramp and Sons Ship and Engine Building Company in Philadelphia, first as designer and since 1879 as superintendent of engineering.

After Camp and Sons, in 1889, See moved to New York, where he worked as consulting engineer for the Newport News Steamship and Dry Dock Company. He was superintending engineer for the Southern Pacific Company, and the Pacific Mail Steamship Company, superintendent for the Cromwell Steam Ship Company. In his private practice as a marine engineer and naval architect he designed and prepared specifications for many yachts and commercial vessels.

See was a member of the Society of Naval Architects and Marine Engineers; of the Royal Institution of Naval Architects of Great Britain; the Northeast Coast Institute of Engineers and Shipbuilders; and the American Geographical Society; associate member of the American Society of Naval Engineers; and the United States Naval Institute; and fellow of the American Association for the Advancement of Science. He was also member of the American Society of Mechanical Engineers, and its president in the year 1888–89.

== Work ==
=== William Cramp and Sons Ship and Engine Building Company ===
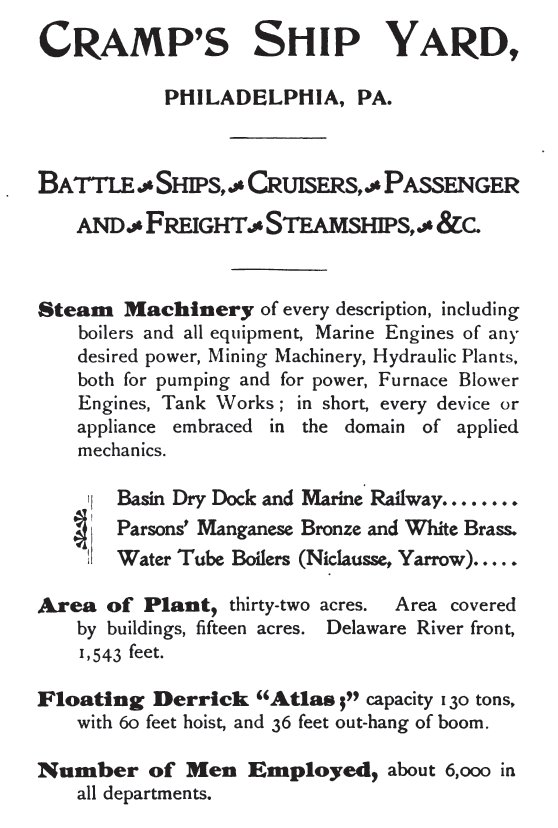
1890s advertisement for William Cramp & Sons, Philadelphia, PA.

See made his most significant contributions working at William Cramp and Sons Ship and Engine Building Company in Philadelphia from the late 1870s to the late 1880s. See has designed and managed the building of some fifty or more large marine engines of, in some cases, as high as 4000 horse power, among which were those of the USS Alameda, one of the first vessels fitted, with triple expansion engines in the United States.

See designed the machinery and superintended the construction of many well-known vessels, such as the USS cruisers Philadelphia and Newark; dynamite cruiser Vesuvius; gunboats Yorktown, Concord, and Bennington; yachts Atalanta and Corsair; Ss. El Mar, El Monte, El Norte, of the Morgan line; the Tacoma, San Pedro, and San Pablo, of the Central R. R. Co.; the Caracas, Valencia, Philadelphia, and Venenzuela, of the Red D. line; Mariposa and Ahneda, of the Sandwich Island line; and the Monmouth of the N.J.C.R.R. Co.

The ASME (1910) summarized that See had been "designing vessels and machinery of greatly improved construction and performance, introducing improved methods of work and standards in that great establishment, and giving to the United States a shipbuilding plant of capacity and quality to compare favorably with the products of the Clyde and Newcastle."

At Camp and Sons, according to the ASME (1910), it was "under his leadership that the United States Navy contracts for the first vessels of what was then called the New Navy of the United States were taken, and the big ships of the American Line at that day bore his impress"

=== Hydro-pneumatic ash ejectors ===
Horace See invented a Hydro-pneumatic ash ejectors, which found their way in many ship designs in his days. For this invention See was awarded in 1904 a John Scott Medal in the field of engineering on behalf of the City of Philadelphia.

In 1906 Horace See published his own trade catalog, Some Sea Specialties. with pictures of yachts, merchant vessels, liners and warships for which his firm provided his hydro-pneumatic ash ejectors.

=== Cross Ocean at 30 Knots per Hour ===
In the 1907 article "To Cross Ocean at 30 Knots per Hour," in The New York Times, republished in the Hawaiian Star, Horace See commented on the design of the first trans-atlantic steamer to do 30 knots per hour.

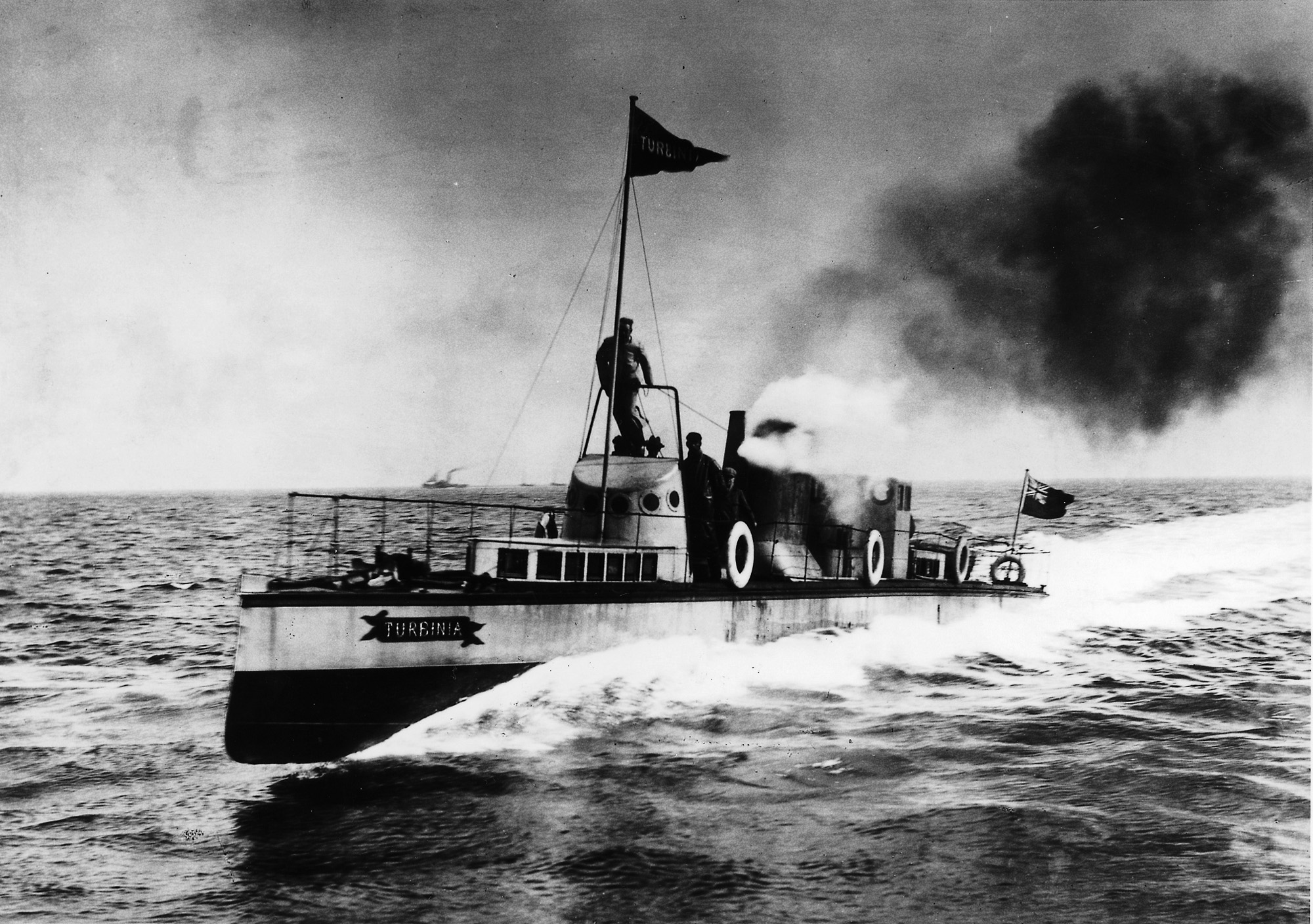
Turbinia at speed in 1897.

According to See the constructing of a 30-knot turbine steamship for transatlantic trade was entirely feasible. Turbine engine would come to stay, and would solve many marine problems. He and a colleague had declared, according to the article, that "there is no question but that the turbine engine will ultimately displace the reciprocating one on shipboard, as it Is now doing on land, but up to, the present time it has failed to do ee or shewn any. Superiority outside of reduced vibration, as there yet remains unsolved the exact combination of turbine, hull, and screw propeller to give results superior to those obtained from the reciprocating engine in vessels..."

One of the chief engineers at the Cramps yard declared, that "it was not until 1894, that the idea of propelling a vessel by means of a turbine was first put into practical form. Before that time the turbine had never been used for marine purposes, but its use had been devoted to pumping, coaling driving fans forced draught and ventilating purposes. The first vessel to be fitted with turbine engines was the Turbinia. Then came torpedo boat destroyers, the Viper and Cobra, achieved remarkable speed, but unfortunately were both lost before it was able to obtain comparisons in service with other destroyers, and this somewhat adversely effected the progress of the turbine engine generally."

Furthermore, the "British cruiser Amethyst was the next step of the application of the turbine war vessels, and the result of the trail of this vessel in compared with sister vessels ordered at the same time and of the same dimensions and lines, butt fitted with other engines demonstrated the economy of the turbine to fit to this class of vessels and more especially of higher power."

== Publications ==
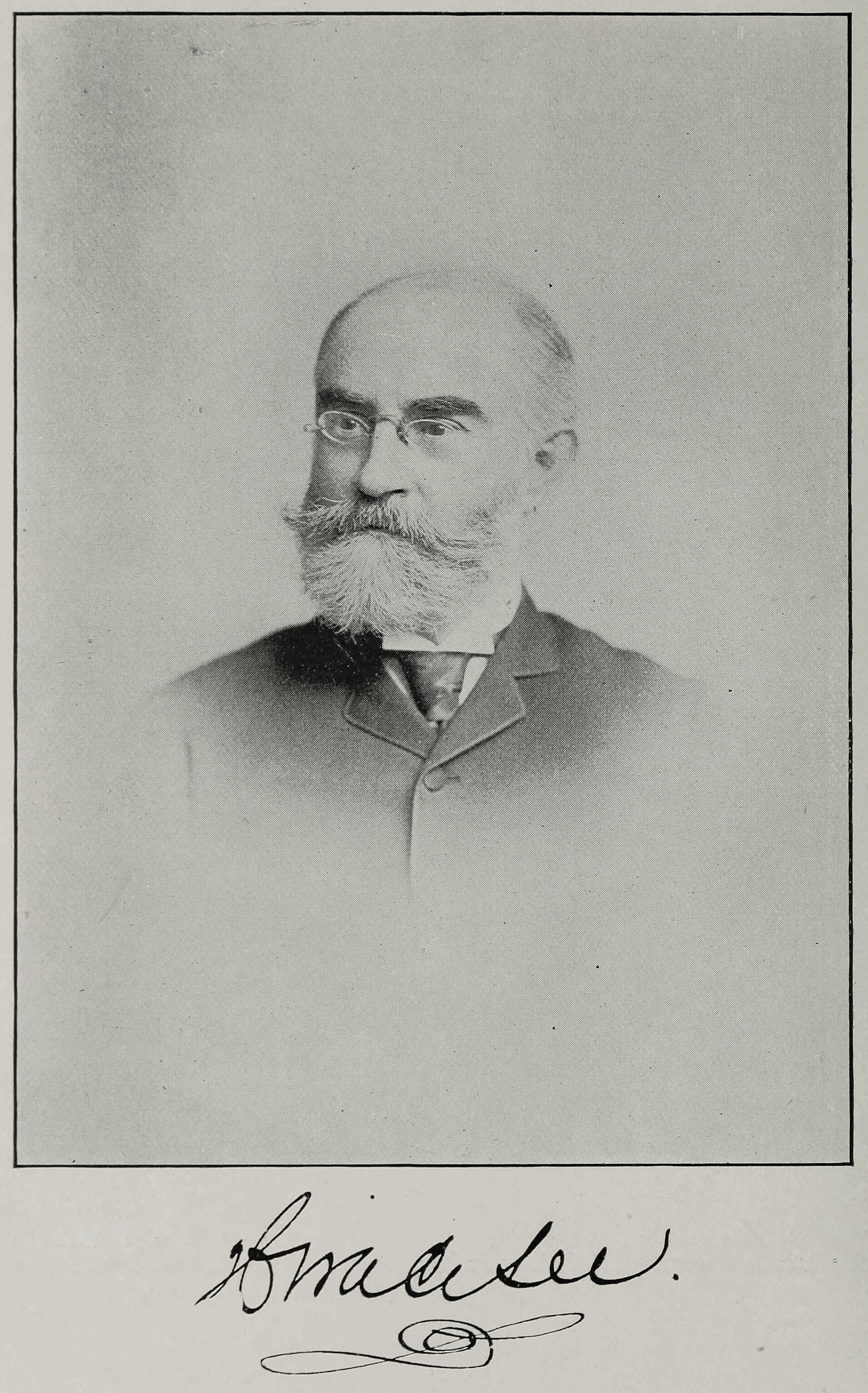
Horace See was portrayed in the July 1892 edition of Cassier's Magazine.

- Horace See, Some Sea Specialties. New York. 1899, 1906.

Articles, a selection

- Horace See. "Build-up work in engine construction," in: ASME Transactions, Vol. 3, 1882. p. 195-98.
- Horace See. "The production of true crankshafts and bearings," in: ASME Transactions, Vol. 7, 1888. p. 521-530.
- Horace See. "President's Address 1888," Trans. Am.Soc.M.E., vol. 10, 1889, p. 482-498
- Horace See, "The building of the steamship in America." Engineering Magazine, Vol 1, 1891; Part 1, May 1891; Part 2, June 1891; Part 3, July, 1891; and: Part 4, August 1891
- Horace See. "Some Notes On Steam Boiler Troubles," Transactions: The Society of Naval Architects and Marine Engineers Vol 13, 1905, p. 209-13

Patents, a selection

- Patent US231501 Tube for surface condensor, 1880
- Patent US439695 Extractor for removing air, 1890
- Patent US505489 Regulating Plug-Cock, 1892-93
- Patent US600237 Steam-boiler, 1897-89

Publications about Horace See

- Charles Morris, "Horace See," in: Men of affairs in New York, New York : L.R. Hamersley, 1906. p. 100-102 (also online here)
