= HMS Dreadnought (1906) =

British battleship (1906–1919)

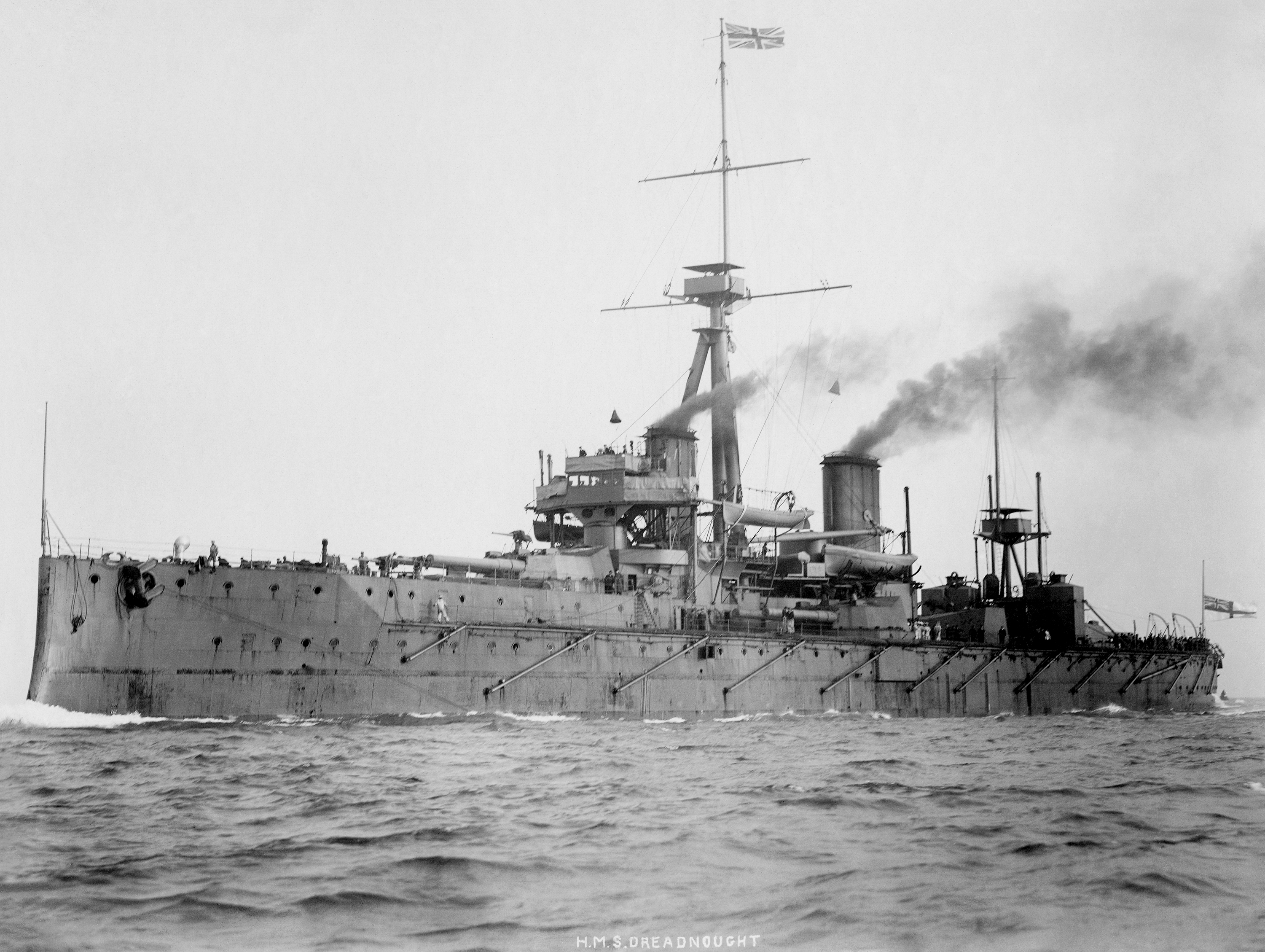
- Dreadnought at sea in 1906

Class overview
- Name: Dreadnought
- Preceded by: Lord Nelson class
- Succeeded by: Bellerophon class
- Built: 1905–1906
- In service: 1906–1919
- In commission: 1906–1919
- Completed: 1
- Scrapped: 1

History

United Kingdom
- Name: Dreadnought
- Ordered: 1905
- Builder: HM Dockyard, Portsmouth
- Laid down: 2 October 1905
- Launched: 10 February 1906
- Commissioned: 2 December 1906
- Decommissioned: February 1919
- Motto: Fear God and Dread Nought
- Fate: Sold for scrap, 9 May 1921

General characteristics (as completed)
- Displacement: 18,120 long tons (18,410 t) (normal load)
- Length: 527 ft (160.6 m)
- Beam: 82 ft 1 in (25 m)
- Draught: 29 ft 7.5 in (9 m) (deep load)
- Installed power: 18 × Babcock & Wilcox boilers; 23,000 shp (17,000 kW)
- Propulsion: 4 × shafts; 2 × steam turbine sets
- Speed: 21 knots (39 km/h; 24 mph)
- Range: 6,620 nmi (12,260 km; 7,620 mi) at 10 knots (19 km/h; 12 mph)
- Complement: 700 (1907); 810 (1916)
- Armament: 5 × twin 12 in (305 mm) guns; 27 × single 12-pdr (3 in (76 mm)) guns; 5 × 18 in (450 mm) torpedo tubes
- Armour: Belt: 4–11 in (102–279 mm); Deck: 0.75–3 in (19–76 mm); Barbettes: 4–11 in (102–279 mm); Turrets: 3–12 in (76–305 mm); Conning tower: 11 in (279 mm); Bulkheads: 8 in (203 mm)

HMS Dreadnought was a Royal Navy battleship, the design of which revolutionised naval power. The ship's entry into service in 1906 represented such an advance in naval technology that her name came to be associated with an entire generation of battleships, the dreadnoughts, as well as the class of ships named after her. Likewise, the generation of ships she made obsolete became known as pre-dreadnoughts. Admiral Sir John "Jacky" Fisher, First Sea Lord of the Board of Admiralty, is credited as the father of Dreadnought. Shortly after he assumed office in 1904, he ordered design studies for a battleship armed solely with 12 in (305 mm) guns and a speed of 21 knots (39 km/h; 24 mph). He convened a Committee on Designs to evaluate the alternative designs and to assist in the detailed design work.

Dreadnought was the first battleship of her era to have a uniform main battery, rather than having a few large guns complemented by a heavy secondary armament of smaller guns. She was also the first capital ship to be powered by steam turbines, making her the fastest battleship in the world at the time of her completion. Her launch helped spark a naval arms race as navies around the world, particularly the Imperial German Navy, rushed to match it in the build-up to the First World War.

Although designed to engage enemy battleships, her only significant action was the ramming and sinking of German submarine SM U-29; thus she became the only battleship confirmed to have sunk a submarine. Dreadnought did not participate in the Battle of Jutland in 1916 as she was being refitted, nor did she participate in any of the other naval battles in World War I. In July 1916 she was relegated to coastal-defence duties in the English Channel, before rejoining the Grand Fleet in 1918. The ship was reduced to reserve in 1919 and sold for scrap two years later.

== Genesis ==
=== Background ===
Cuniberti's "ideal battleship"

Gunnery developments in the late 1890s and the early 1900s, led in the United Kingdom by Percy Scott and in the United States by William Sims, were already pushing expected battle ranges out to an unprecedented 6,000 yd (5,500 m), a distance great enough to force gunners to wait for the shells to arrive before applying corrections for the next salvo. A related problem was that the shell splashes from the more numerous smaller weapons tended to obscure the splashes from the bigger guns. Either the smaller-calibre guns would have to hold their fire to wait for the slower-firing heavies, losing the advantage of their faster rate of fire, or it would be uncertain whether a splash was due to a heavy or a light gun, making ranging and aiming unreliable. Another problem was that longer-range torpedoes were expected soon to be in service and these would discourage ships from closing to ranges where the smaller guns' faster rate of fire would become preeminent. Keeping the range open generally negated the threat from torpedoes and further reinforced the need for heavy guns of a uniform calibre.

In 1903, the Italian naval architect Vittorio Cuniberti first wrote about the concept of an all-big-gun battleship. When the Italian Navy did not pursue his ideas, Cuniberti wrote an article in Jane's Fighting Ships advocating his concept. He proposed an "ideal" future British battleship of 17,000 long tons (17,000 t), with a main battery of a dozen 12-inch guns in eight turrets, 12 inches of belt armour, and a speed of 24 knots (44 km/h; 28 mph).

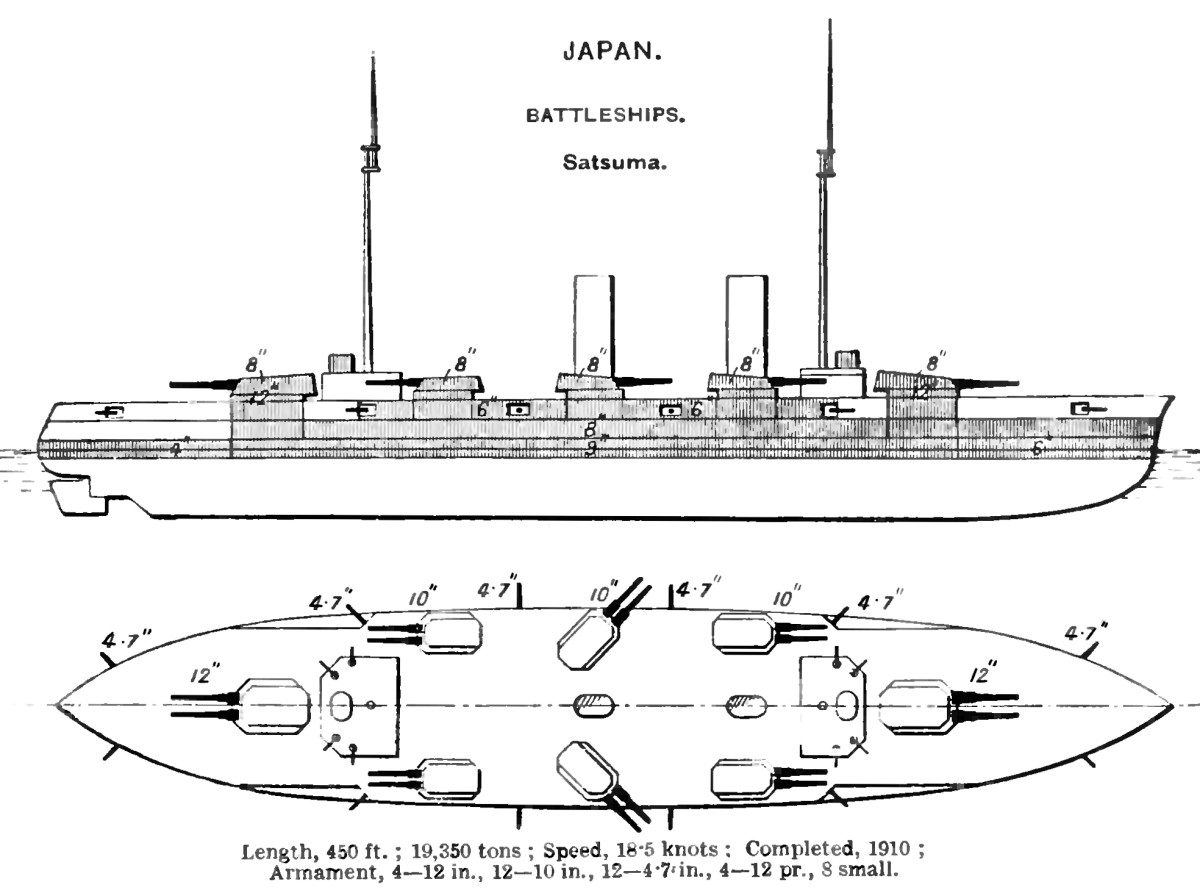
"Intermediate-dreadnought" Satsuma

The Royal Navy, the Imperial Japanese Navy and the United States Navy all recognised these issues before 1905. The Royal Navy modified the design of the Lord Nelson-class battleship to include a secondary armament of 9.2 in (234 mm) guns that could fight at longer ranges than the 6 in (152 mm) guns on older ships, but a proposal to arm them solely with 12-inch guns was rejected. (Note: This type of battleship with its secondary armament 9.2 inches or greater would become known retroactively as semi-dreadnoughts. See Sturton, p. 11) The Japanese battleship Satsuma was laid down as an all-big-gun battleship, five months before Dreadnought, but gun shortages allowed her to be equipped with only four of the twelve 12-inch guns that had been planned. The Americans began design work on an all-big-gun battleship around the same time in 1904, but progress was leisurely and the two South Carolina-class battleships were not ordered until March 1906, five months after Dreadnought was laid down, and the month after she was launched.

The invention by Charles Algernon Parsons of the steam turbine in 1884 led to a significant increase in the speed of ships with his dramatic unauthorised demonstration of his yacht Turbinia with her speed of up to 34 knots (63 km/h; 39 mph) at Queen Victoria's Diamond Jubilee at Spithead in 1897. After further trials of two turbine-powered destroyers, Viper and Cobra, coupled with the positive experiences of several small passenger ships with turbines, Dreadnought was ordered with turbines.

The Battle of the Yellow Sea and Battle of Tsushima were analysed by Fisher's Committee, with Captain William Pakenham's statement that "12-inch gunfire" by both sides demonstrated hitting power and accuracy, whilst 10-inch shells passed unnoticed. Admiral Fisher wanted his board to confirm, refine and implement his ideas of a warship that had both the speed of 21 knots and 12-inch guns, pointing out that at the Battle of Tsushima, the Japanese ships commanded by Admiral Togo had been able to "cross the T" of the Russian ships due to speed. The long-range (14,000-yard (13,000 m)) engagement during the Battle of the Yellow Sea, in particular, although never experienced by any navy prior to the battle, seemed to confirm what the Royal Navy already believed.

=== Development ===
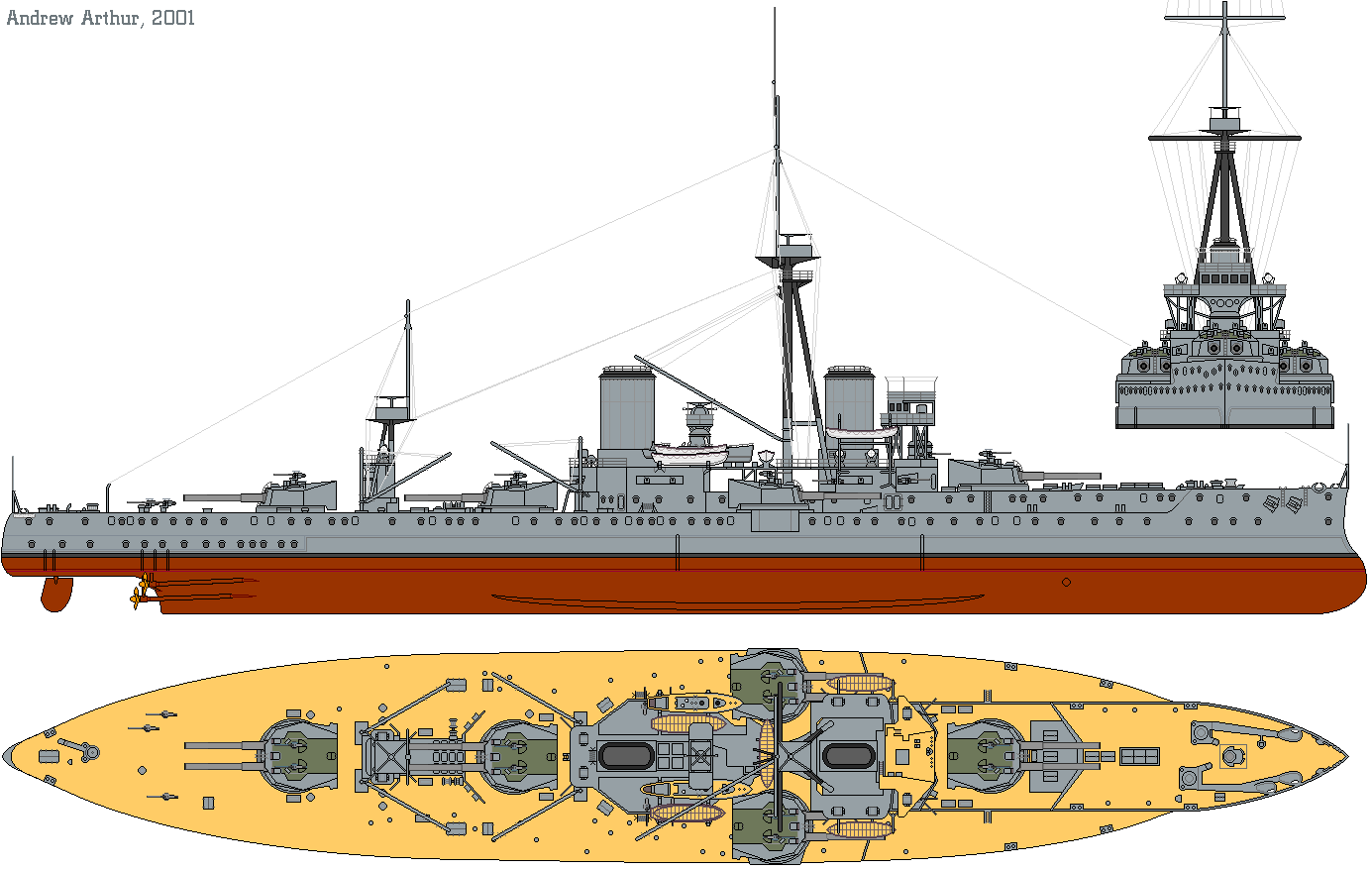
3-view drawing of HMS Dreadnought in 1911, with QF 12 pdr guns added

Admiral Fisher proposed several designs for battleships with a uniform armament in the early 1900s, and he gathered an unofficial group of advisors to assist him in deciding on the ideal characteristics in early 1904. After he was appointed First Sea Lord on 20 October 1904, he pushed through the Board of Admiralty a decision to arm the next battleship with 12 inch guns and that it would have a speed no less than 21 knots. In January 1905, he convened a "Committee on Designs", including many members of his informal group, to evaluate the various design proposals and to assist in the detailed design process. While nominally independent it served to deflect criticism of Fisher and the Board of Admiralty as it had no ability to consider options other than those already decided upon by the Admiralty. Fisher appointed all of the members of the committee and he was President of the Committee.

The committee decided on the layout of the main armament, rejecting any superfiring arrangements because of concerns about the effects of muzzle blast on the open sighting hoods on the turret roof below, and on 18 January 1905 chose turbine propulsion over reciprocating engines to save 1,100 long tons (1,100 t) in total displacement. Before disbanding on 22 February, it decided on a number of other issues, including the number of shafts (up to six were considered), the size of the anti-torpedo boat armament, and most importantly, to add longitudinal bulkheads to protect the magazines and shell rooms from underwater explosions. This was deemed necessary after the Russian battleship Tsesarevich was thought to have survived a Japanese torpedo hit during the Russo–Japanese War by virtue of her heavy internal bulkhead. To avoid increasing the displacement of the ship, the thickness of her waterline belt was reduced by 1 in (25 mm).

The Committee reported their findings in March 1905. It was decided due to the experimental nature of the design to delay placing orders for any other ships until Dreadnought and her trials had been completed. Once the design had been finalised the hull form was designed and tested at the Admiralty's experimental ship tank at Gosport. Seven iterations were required before the final hull form was selected. Once the design was finalized, a team of three assistant constructors and 13 draughtsmen produced detailed drawings. To assist in speeding up the ship's construction, the internal hull structure was simplified as much as possible and an attempt was made to standardize on a limited number of standard plates, which varied only in their thickness.

== Description ==
=== Overview ===
Hull longitudinal section CC – condenser compartment; ER – engine room; BR – boiler room; WTB – watertight bulkhead; WTF – watertight frame. 1 – after capstan; 2, 4 – torpedo head magazine; 3 – mess space; 5 – fore top; 6 – engine room vent; 7 – boiler room vent; 8 – signal tower; 9 – ; 10 – main top; 11 – admirals sea cabin; 12 – chart house; 13 – conning tower; 14 – officers' cabin; 15 – escape trunk; 16 – vent; 17 – capstan; 18 – trimming tank; 19 – capstan engine room; 20 – submerged torpedo room; 21 – 12 in shellroom; 22 – 12 in magazines; 23 – ash hoist; 24 – reserve feed-water tank; 25 – coal bunker; 26 – coal shute; 27 – electric lift; 28 – oil fuel tank; 29 – fresh water tank; 30 – submerged torpedo room; 31 – fresh water tank; 32 – stern torpedo tube

Dreadnought was significantly larger than the two ships of the Lord Nelson class, which were under construction at the same time. She had an overall length of 527 ft (160.6 m), a beam of 82 ft 1 in (25 m), and a draught of 29 ft 7.5 in (9 m) at deep load. She displaced 18,120 long tons (18,410 t) at normal load and 20,730 long tons (21,060 t) at deep load, almost 3,000 long tons (3,000 t) more than the earlier ships. She had a metacentric height of 5.6 ft (1.7 m) at deep load and a complete double bottom.

Officers were customarily housed aft, but Dreadnought reversed the old arrangement, so that the officers were closer to their action stations. This was very unpopular with the officers, not least because they were now berthed near the noisy auxiliary machinery while the turbines made the rear of the ship much quieter than they had been in earlier steamships. This arrangement lasted among the British dreadnoughts until the King George V class of 1910. The crew numbered 700 officers and ratings in 1907, but increased to 810 in 1916.

=== Propulsion ===
Vickers, Sons & Maxim was the prime contractor for the ship's machinery, but as they had no large turbine experience, they sourced some from Parsons. Dreadnought was the first battleship to use turbines in place of the older reciprocating triple-expansion steam engines. She had two paired sets of direct-drive turbines, each of which drove two 8-foot-10-inch (2.7 m) diameter, three-bladed propellers using steam provided by 18 Babcock & Wilcox boilers that had a working pressure of 250 psi (1,724 kPa; 18 kgf/cm^{2}). The turbines, rated at 23,000 shaft horsepower (17,000 kW), were intended to give a maximum speed of 21 knots; the ship reached 21.6 knots (40.0 km/h; 24.9 mph) from 27,018 shp (20,147 kW) during her sea trials on 9 October 1906.

General arrangement of port engine room
1 – outer shaft; 2 – exhaust trunk from high pressure (HP) astern turbine for low pressure (LP) astern turbine; 3 – HP astern turbine; 4 – dummy piston; 5 – rotor shaft bearings; 6 – HP ahead turbine; 7 – inner shaft; 8 – main steam to HP ahead turbine; 9 – thrust block (outer); 10 – main steam to HP astern turbine; 11 – main steam from boiler room; 12 – astern manoeuvring valve; 13 – ahead manoeuvring valve; 14 – cruising manoeuvring valve; 15 – main steam to cruising turbine; 16 – main condenser; 17 – exhaust to the condenser; 18 – LP astern turbine; 19 – LP ahead turbine; 20 – exhaust trunk from HP for LP ahead turbine; 21 – exhaust trunk from cruising to HP ahead turbine; 22 – cruising turbine; 23 – thrust block (inner)

Dreadnought carried 2,868 long tons (2,914 t) of coal, and an additional 1,120 long tons (1,140 t) of fuel oil that was to be sprayed on the coal to increase its burn rate. At full capacity, she could steam for 6,620 nautical miles (12,260 km; 7,620 mi) at a speed of 10 knots (19 km/h; 12 mph).

=== Armament ===
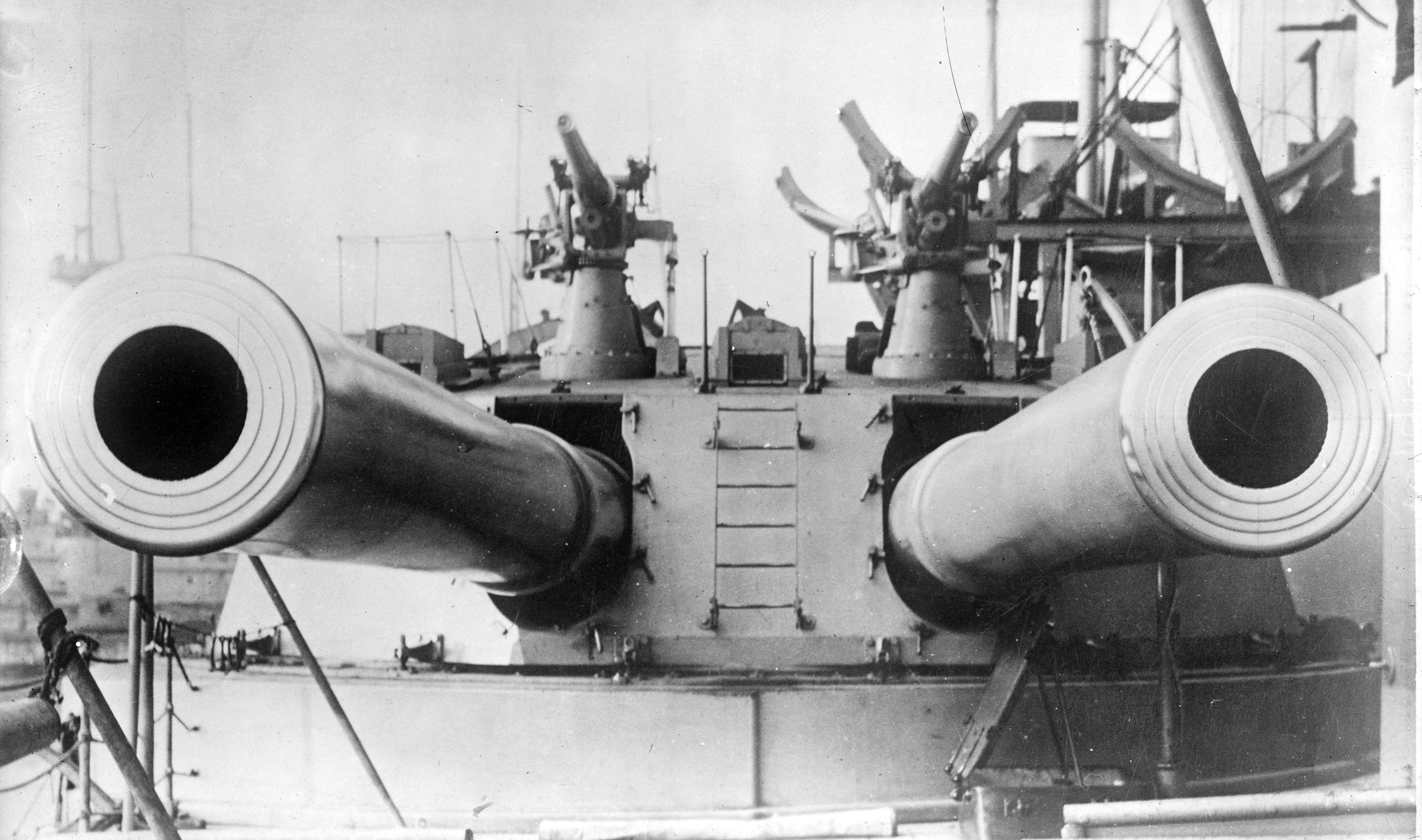
Turret with twin 12-inch Mk X guns. Two 12-pounder guns are mounted on the roof for defence against torpedo boats.

Dreadnought's main armament consisted of ten 45-calibre BL 12-inch Mark X guns in five twin Mark BVIII gun turrets. The forward turret ('A') and two aft turrets ('X' and 'Y') were located along the centreline of the ship. Two wing turrets ('P' and 'Q') were located port and starboard of the forward superstructure respectively. Dreadnought could deliver a broadside of eight guns between 60° before the beam and 50° abaft the beam. Beyond these limits she could fire six guns aft, and four forward. On bearings 1° ahead or astern she could fire six guns, although she would have inflicted blast damage on the superstructure.

The guns could be depressed to −3° and elevated to +13.5°. They fired 850 lb (390 kg) projectiles at a muzzle velocity of 2,725 ft/s (831 m/s), giving a maximum range of 16,450 yd (15,040 m) with armour-piercing (AP) 2 crh shells. Using the more aerodynamic, but slightly heavier, 4 crh AP shells extended the range to 18,850 yd (17,240 m). The rate of fire of these guns was about two rounds per minute. The ships carried 80 rounds per gun.

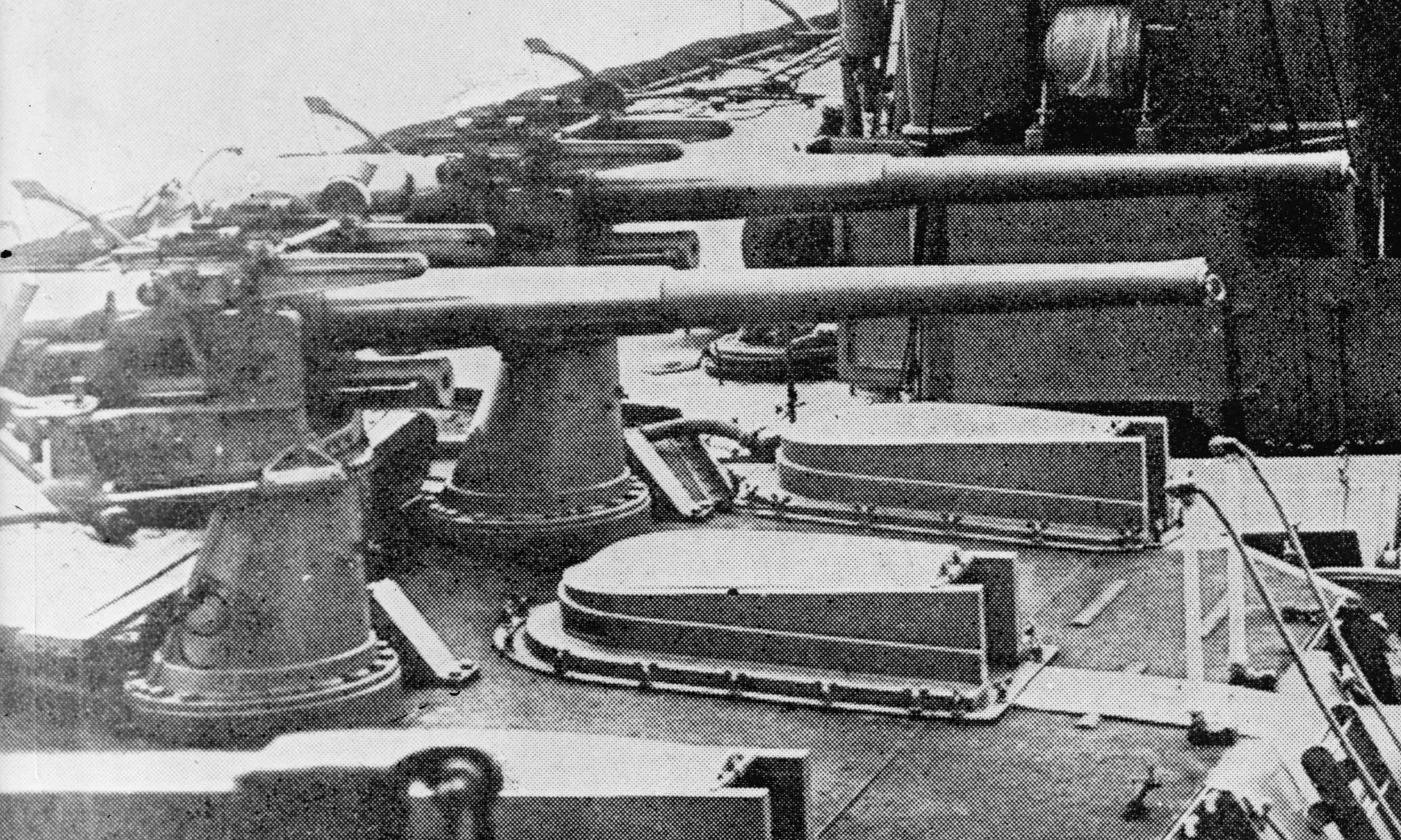
12-pounder guns mounted on 'X' turret; note the sighting hoods on the turret roof.

The secondary armament initially consisted of twenty-seven 50-calibre, quick-firing (QF) 3 in (76 mm) 12-pounder 18 cwt Mark I guns. (Note: "Cwt" is the abbreviation for hundredweight, 18 cwt referring to the weight of the gun.) The guns had an elevation range between −10° and +20°. They fired 12.5 lb (5.7 kg) projectiles at a muzzle velocity of 2,660 ft/s (810 m/s). The guns had a rate of fire of 20 rounds per minute. The ship carried three hundred rounds for each gun.

The original plan was to dismount the eight guns on the forecastle and quarterdeck and stow them on chocks on the deck during daylight to prevent them from being damaged by muzzle blast from the main guns. Gun trials in December 1906 proved that this was more difficult than expected and the two port guns from the forecastle and the outer starboard gun from the quarterdeck were transferred to turret roofs, giving each turret two guns. The remaining forecastle guns and the outer port gun from the quarterdeck were removed by the end of 1907, which reduced the total to twenty-four guns. During her April–May 1915 refit, the two guns from the roof of 'A' turret were reinstalled in the original positions on the starboard side of the quarterdeck. A year later, the two guns at the rear of the superstructure were removed, reducing the ship to twenty-two guns. Two of the quarterdeck guns were given high-angle mounts for anti-aircraft duties and the two guns abreast the conning tower were removed in 1917.

A pair of QF six-pounder (2.2 in (57 mm)) Hotchkiss anti-aircraft guns on high-angle mountings were mounted on the quarterdeck in 1915. They had a maximum depression of −8° and a maximum elevation of +60°. The 6 lb (2.7 kg) shell was fired at a muzzle velocity of 1,765 ft/s (538 m/s). They were replaced by a pair of QF 3-inch 20 cwt guns on high-angle Mark II mounts in 1916. These guns had a maximum depression of 10° and a maximum elevation of 90°. They fired a 12.5-pound shell at a muzzle velocity of 2,517 ft/s (767 m/s) at a rate of 29 rounds per minute. They had a maximum effective ceiling of 23,500 ft (7,200 m).

Dreadnought carried five 18-inch (450 mm) submerged torpedo tubes, two on each broadside and one in the stern. Twenty-three torpedoes were carried for them. In addition six 14 in (356 mm) torpedoes were carried for her steam picket boats.

=== Fire control ===
Dreadnought was one of the first vessels of the Royal Navy to be fitted with instruments for electrically transmitting range, order and deflection information to the turrets. The control positions for the main armament were located in the spotting top at the head of the foremast and on a platform on the roof of the signal tower. Data from a 9 ft (2.7 m) Barr and Stroud FQ-2 rangefinder located at each control position was input into a Dumaresq mechanical computer and electrically transmitted to Vickers range clocks located in the Transmitting Station located beneath each position on the main deck, where it was converted into range and deflection data for use by the guns. Voice pipes were retained for use between the Transmitting Station and the control positions. The target's data was also graphically recorded on a plotting table to assist the gunnery officer in predicting the movement of the target. The turrets, Transmitting Stations, and control positions could be connected in almost any combination.

Firing trials against Hero in 1907 revealed this system's vulnerability to gunfire, as its spotting top was hit twice and a large splinter severed the voice pipe and all wiring running along the mast. To guard against this possibility, Dreadnought's fire-control system was comprehensively upgraded during her refits in 1912–13. The rangefinder in the foretop was given a gyro-stabilized Argo mount and 'A' and 'Y' turrets were upgraded to serve as secondary control positions for any portion or all of the main armament. An additional 9-foot rangefinder was installed on the compass platform. In addition, 'A' turret was fitted with another 9-foot rangefinder at the rear of the turret roof and a Mark I Dreyer Fire Control Table was installed in the main Transmitting Station. It combined the functions of the Dumaresq and the range clock.

Fire-control technology advanced quickly during the years immediately preceding the First World War, and the most important development was the director firing system. This consisted of a fire-control director mounted high in the ship which electrically provided data to the turrets via pointers, which the turret crew were to follow. The director layer fired the guns simultaneously which aided in spotting the shell splashes and minimised the effects of the roll on the dispersion of the shells. A prototype was fitted in Dreadnought in 1909, but it was removed to avoid conflict with her duties as flagship of the Home Fleet. Preparations to install a production director were made during her May–June 1915 refit and every turret received a 9 ft (2.7 m) rangefinder at the same time. The exact date of the installation of the director is not known, other than it was not fitted before the end of 1915, and it was most likely mounted during her April–June 1916 refit.

=== Armour ===
Dreadnought used Krupp cemented armour throughout, unless otherwise mentioned. Her waterline belt measured 11 in (279 mm) thick, but tapered to 7 in (178 mm) at its lower edge. It extended from the rear of 'A' barbette to the centre of 'Y' barbette. Oddly, it was reduced to 9 in (229 mm) abreast 'A' barbette. A 6 in (152 mm) extension ran from 'A' barbette forward to the bow and a similar 4 inch extension ran aft to the stern. An 8 in (203 mm) bulkhead was angled obliquely inwards from the end of the main belt to the side of 'X' barbette to fully enclose the armoured citadel at middle deck level. An 8-inch belt sat above the main belt, but only ran as high as the main deck. One major problem with Dreadnought's armour scheme was that the top of the 11 inch belt was only 2 ft (0.6 m) above the waterline at normal load and it was submerged by over 12 inches at deep load, which meant that the waterline was then protected only by the 8 inch upper belt.

Cross-section amidships showing the armour layout

The turret faces and sides were protected by 11 inches of armour, while the turret roofs used 3 inches of Krupp non-cemented armour (KNC). The exposed faces of the barbettes were 11 inches thick, but the inner faces were 8 inches thick above the main deck. 'X' barbette's was 8 inches thick all around. Below the main deck, the barbettes' armour thinned to four inches except for 'A' barbette (eight inches) and 'Y' which remained 11 inches thick. The thickness of the main deck ranged from 0.75 to 1 in (19 to 25 mm). The middle deck was 1.75 in (44 mm) thick on the flat and 2.75 inches (70 mm) where it sloped down to meet the bottom edge of the main belt. Over the magazine for 'A' and 'Y' turrets it was 3 inches thick, on slope and flat both. The lower deck armour was 1.5 inches (38 mm) forward and 2 inches aft where it increased to 3 inches to protect the steering gear.

The sides of the conning tower were 11 inches thick and it had a 3-inch roof of KNC. It had a communications tube with 8 inch walls of mild steel down to the Transmitting Station on the middle deck. The walls of the signal tower were 8 inches thick while it had a roof of 3 inches of KNC armour. 2 inch torpedo bulkheads were fitted abreast the magazines and shell rooms of 'A', 'X' and 'Y' turrets, but this increased to 4 inches abreast 'P' and 'Q' turrets to compensate for their outboard location.

In common with all major warships of her day, Dreadnought was fitted with anti-torpedo nets, but these were removed early in the war, since they caused considerable loss of speed and were easily defeated by torpedoes fitted with net-cutters.

=== Electrical equipment ===
Electrical power was provided by three 100 kW, 100 V DC Siemens generators, powered by two Brotherhood steam and two Mirrlees diesel engines (which later changed to three steam and one diesel). Among the equipment powered by 100 volt DC and 15 volt DC electrical systems were five lifts (elevators), eight coaling winches, pumps, ventilation fans, lighting and telephone systems.

== Construction ==
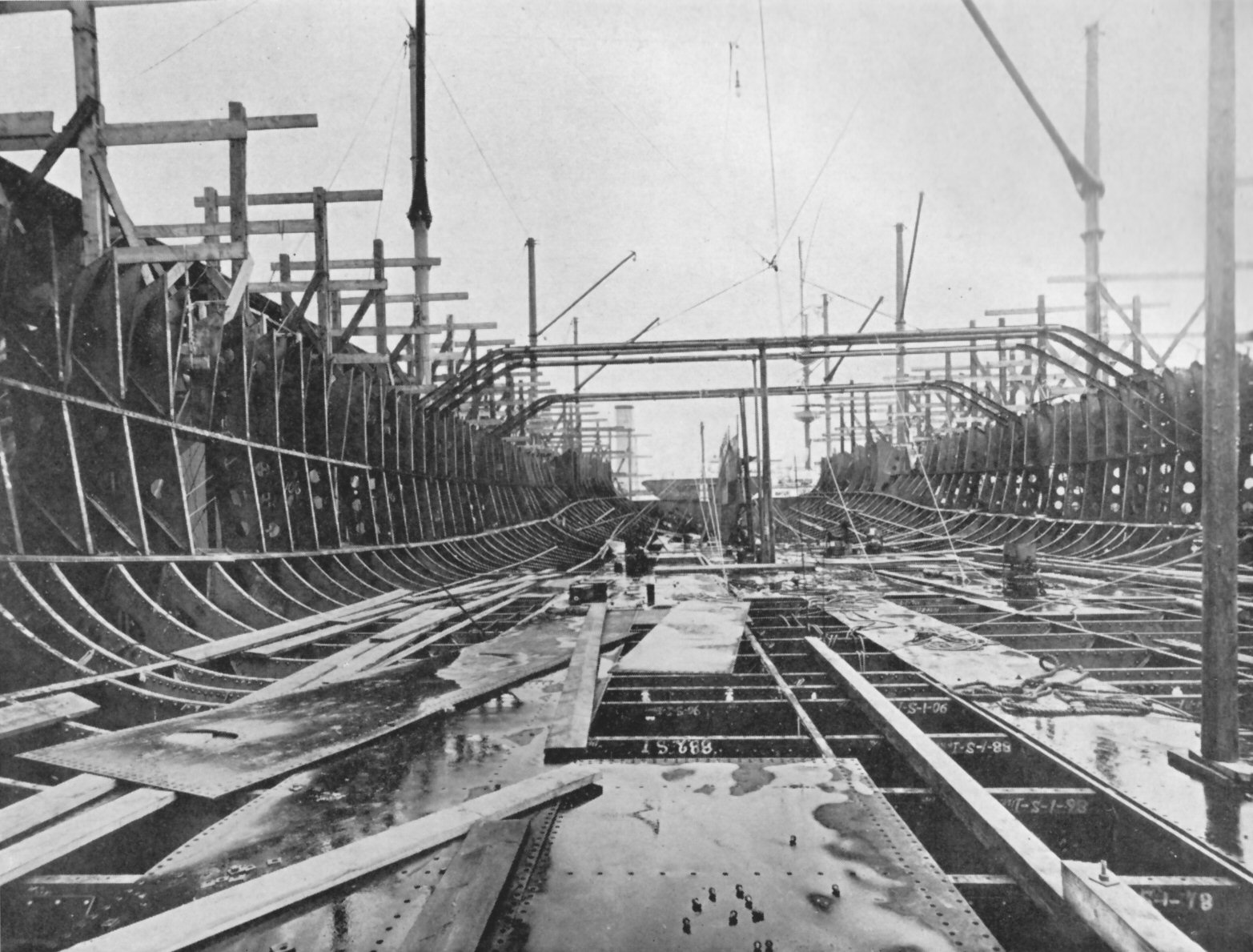
Dreadnought two days after the keel was laid. Most of lower frames are in place plus a few of the beams which supported the armoured deck.

Dreadnought was the sixth ship of the Royal Navy to bear the name, which means "fear nothing". To meet Fisher's goal of building the ship in a single year, material was stockpiled in advance and a great deal of prefabrication was done from May 1905 with about 6,000 man weeks of work expended before she was formally laid down on 2 October 1905. She was built at HM Dockyard, Portsmouth, which was regarded as the fastest-building shipyard in the world. No. 5 Slip was screened from prying eyes; attempts were made to indicate that the design was no different to other battleships. Some 1,100 men were already employed by the time she was laid down, but soon this number rose to 3,000. Whereas on previous ships the men had worked a 48-hour week, they were required on Dreadnought to work a 69-hour, six-day week from 6 a.m. to 6 p.m., which included compulsory overtime with only a 30-minute lunch break. While double-shifting was considered to ease the long hours which were unpopular with the men, this was not possible due to labour shortages. On Day 6 (7 October), the first of the bulkheads and most of the middle-deck beams were in place. By Day 20, the forward part of the bow was in position and the hull plating was well underway. By Day 55 all of the upper-deck beams were in place, and by Day 83 the upper deck plates were in position. By Day 125 (4 February), the hull was finished.

Dreadnought was christened with a bottle of Irvine's sparkling Australian wine by King Edward VII on 10 February 1906, after only four months on the ways. The bottle required multiple blows to shatter on a bow that later became famous. Signifying the ship's importance the launch had been planned to be a large elaborate festive event but the court was still in mourning for Queen Alexandra's father the King of Denmark who had died 12 days before, so she did not attend and a more sober event occurred. Post-launch fitting out of the ship was done at No.15 Dock.

Sources differ on the cost of the ship's construction: £1,785,683, £1,783,883, and £1,672,483.

== Trials ==
On 1 October 1906, steam was raised and she went to sea on 3 October 1906 for two days of trials at Devonport, only a year and a day after construction started. On the 9th she undertook her eight-hour-long full-power contractor trials off Polperro on the Cornwall coast during which she averaged 20.05 knots and 21.6 knots on the measured mile. She returned to Portsmouth for gun and torpedo trials before she completed her final fitting out. She was commissioned into the fleet on 11 December 1906, fifteen months after she was laid down. The suggestion that her building had been sped up by using guns and/or turrets originally designed for the Lord Nelson-class ships which preceded her is not borne out as the guns and turrets were not ordered until July 1905. It seems more likely that Dreadnought's turrets and guns merely received higher priority than those of the earlier ships.

Dreadnought sailed for the Mediterranean Sea for extensive trials in December 1906 calling in at Arosa Bay, Gibraltar and Golfo d'Aranci before crossing the Atlantic to Port of Spain, Trinidad, in January 1907, returning to Portsmouth on 23 March 1907. During this cruise, her engines and guns were given a thorough workout by Captain Reginald Bacon, Fisher's former Naval Assistant and a member of the Committee on Designs. His report stated, "No member of the Committee on Designs dared to hope that all the innovations introduced would have turned out as successfully as had been the case." During this time she averaged 17 knots (31 km/h; 20 mph) between Gibraltar and Trinidad and 19 knots (35 km/h; 22 mph) from Trinidad to Portsmouth, an unprecedented high-speed performance. This shakedown cruise revealed several issues that were dealt with in subsequent refits, notably the replacement of her steering engines and the addition of cooling machinery to reduce the temperature levels in her magazines (cordite degrades more quickly at high temperatures). The most important issue, which was never addressed in her lifetime, was that the placement of her foremast behind the forward funnel put the spotting top right in the plume of hot exhaust gases, much to the detriment of her fighting ability.

== Career ==
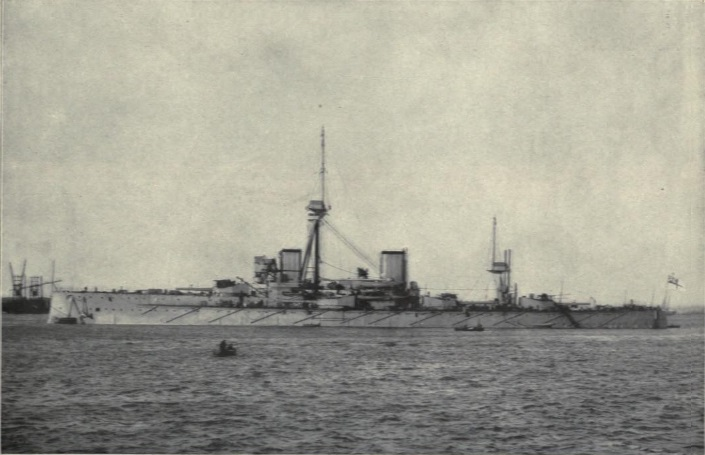
Dreadnought 1906–1908

From 1907 to 1911, Dreadnought served as flagship of the Royal Navy's Home Fleet. In 1910, she attracted the attention of notorious hoaxer Horace de Vere Cole, who persuaded the Royal Navy to arrange for a party of Abyssinian royals to be given a tour of a ship. In reality, the "Abyssinian royals" were some of Cole's friends in blackface and disguise, including a young Virginia Woolf and her Bloomsbury Group friends; it became known as the Dreadnought hoax. Cole had picked Dreadnought because she was at that time the most prominent and visible symbol of Britain's naval might.

She was replaced as flagship of the Home Fleet by Neptune in March 1911 and was assigned to the 1st Division of the Home Fleet. She participated in King George V's Coronation Fleet Review in June 1911. Dreadnought became flagship of the 4th Battle Squadron in December 1912 after her transfer from the 1st Battle Squadron, as the 1st Division had been renamed earlier in the year. Between September and December 1913 she was training in the Mediterranean Sea.

At the outbreak of the First World War in 1914, she was flagship of the 4th Battle Squadron in the North Sea, based at Scapa Flow. She was relieved as flagship on 10 December by Benbow. Ironically for a vessel designed to engage enemy battleships, her only significant action was the ramming and sinking of German submarine SM U-29, skippered by K/Lt Otto Weddigen (of SM U-9 fame), in the Pentland Firth on 18 March 1915. U-29 had broken the surface immediately ahead of Dreadnought after firing a torpedo at Neptune, and Dreadnought cut the submarine in two after a short chase. She almost collided with Temeraire who was also attempting to ram the submarine. Dreadnought thus became the only battleship ever to purposefully sink an enemy submarine. (Note: The American battleship New York may have sunk a submarine in October 1918, when she accidentally collided with what was suspected to be a submerged U-boat. That sinking has never been conclusively established, however.) (Note: HMS Warspite did so indirectly, as her Fairey Swordfish floatplane bombed and sank U-64 during the Battles of Narvik.)

She was refitting at Portsmouth from 18 April to 22 June 1916 and missed the Battle of Jutland on 31 May, the most significant fleet engagement of the war. Dreadnought became flagship of the 3rd Battle Squadron on 9 July, based at Sheerness on the Thames, part of a force of pre-dreadnoughts intended to counter the threat of shore bombardment by German battlecruisers. During this time, she fired her AA guns at German aircraft that passed over her headed for London. She returned to the Grand Fleet in March 1918, resuming her role as flagship of the 4th Battle Squadron, but was paid off on 7 August 1918 at Rosyth. She was recommissioned on 25 February 1919 as a tender to Hercules to act as a parent ship for the Reserve Fleet.

Dreadnought was put up for sale on 31 March 1920 and sold for scrap to Thos. W. Ward on 9 May 1921 as one of the 113 ships that the firm purchased at a flat rate of £2. 10/- per ton, later reduced to £2. 4/- per ton. As Dreadnought was assessed at 16,650 tons, she cost the shipbreaker £36,630 though another source states £44,750. She was broken up at Ward's new premises at Inverkeithing, Scotland, upon arrival on 2 January 1923. Very few artifacts from Dreadnought have survived, although a gun tampion is in the National Maritime Museum at Greenwich.

== Significance ==
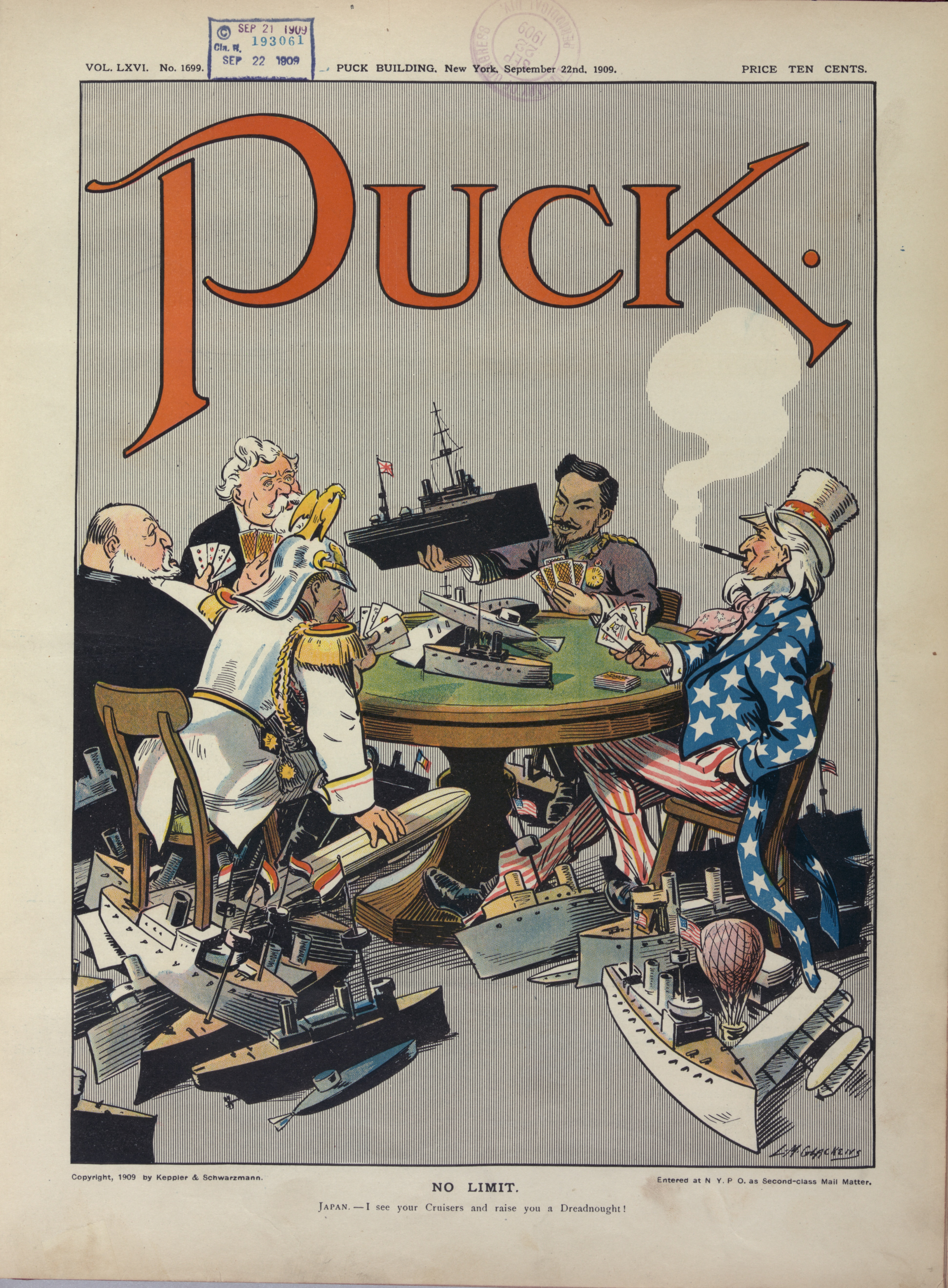
1909 cartoon in Puck shows (clockwise) United States, Germany, Britain, France and Japan engaged in naval race in a "no limit" game.

Her design so thoroughly eclipsed earlier types that subsequent battleships of all nations were generically known as "dreadnoughts" and older battleships as "pre-dreadnoughts". Her very short construction time was intended to demonstrate that Britain could build an unassailable lead in the new type of battleships. Her construction sparked a naval arms race, and soon all major fleets were adding Dreadnought-like ships.

In 1960, Britain's first nuclear submarine was named HMS Dreadnought (S101). The name will be used again for the lead ship of the new class of Trident missile submarines.

The modern acoustic guitar developed with a wide, deep body was named the Dreadnought shape after this ship.

In 2014, a newly classified genus of Titanosaurid sauropod dinosaurs was named Dreadnoughtus due to its gigantic size making it "virtually impervious" to attack; the name, which means "fear nothing", was inspired by the battleship.

== Sources ==
External videos
- Booknotes interview with Robert Massie on Dreadnought: Britain, Germany and the Coming of the Great War, 8 March 1992, C-SPAN

- Archibald, E. H. H. (1984). The Fighting Ship in the Royal Navy, AD 897–1984. Blandford Press. ISBN 0-7137-1348-8.
- Blyth, Robert J. et al. eds. The Dreadnought and the Edwardian Age (2011)
- Brooks, John (2005). Dreadnought Gunnery and the Battle of Jutland: The Question of Fire Control. Naval Policy and History. Vol. 32. Routledge. ISBN 0-415-40788-5.
- Brown, David K. (1997). Warrior to Dreadnought: Warship Development 1860–1905. Chatham Publishing. ISBN 1-86176-022-1.
- Brown, Paul (January 2017), "Building Dreadnought", Ships Monthly: 24–27
- Burt, R. A. (2012) [1986]. British Battleships of World War One. Naval Institute Press. ISBN 978-1-59114-053-5.
- Forczyk, Robert (2009). Russian Battleship vs Japanese Battleship: Yellow Sea 1904–05. Osprey. ISBN 978-1-84603-330-8.
- Friedman, Norman (2011). Naval Weapons of World War One: Guns, Torpedoes, Mines and ASW Weapons of All Nations; An Illustrated Directory. Seaforth Publishing. ISBN 978-1-84832-100-7.
- Gardiner, Robert, ed. (1992). The Eclipse of the Big Gun: The Warship, 1906–45. Conway's History of the Ship. Conway Maritime Press. ISBN 0-85177-607-8.
- Johnston, Ian & Buxton, Ian (2013). The Battleship Builders - Constructing and Arming British Capital Ships. Naval Institute Press. ISBN 978-1-59114-027-6.
- Jones, Jerry W. (1995). U.S. Battleship Operations in World War I, 1917–1918. University of North Texas. OCLC 37111409.
- Massie, Robert K. (1991). Dreadnought: Britain, Germany, and the Coming of the Great War. Random House. ISBN 0-394-52833-6.
- Parkes, Oscar (1990) [1966]. British Battleships, Warrior 1860 to Vanguard 1950: A History of Design, Construction, and Armament (New & rev. ed.). Naval Institute Press. ISBN 1-55750-075-4.
- Preston, Antony (1985). "Great Britain and Empire Forces". In Gray, Randal (ed.). Conway's All the World's Fighting Ships 1906–1921. Naval Institute Press. pp. 1–104. ISBN 0-85177-245-5.
- Roberts, John (2001) [1992]. The Battleship Dreadnought. Anatomy of the Ship (revised ed.). Naval Institute Press. ISBN 1-55750-057-6.
- Ross, Angus (April 2010). "HMS Dreadnought (1906)—A Naval Revolution Misinterpreted or Mishandled?" (PDF). The Northern Mariner. XX (2): 175–198. doi:10.25071/2561-5467.491. S2CID 247286659.
- Sturton, Ian, ed. (2008). Conway's Battleships: The Definitive Visual Reference to the World's All-Big-Gun Ships (2nd revised and expanded ed.). Naval Institute Press. ISBN 978-1-59114-132-7.
- Sumida, Jon Tetsuro (1993). In Defense of Naval Supremacy: Financial Limitation, Technological Innovation and British Naval Policy, 1889–1914. Routledge. ISBN 0-415-08674-4. OCLC 28909592.
