= HMS Velox (1902) =

Destroyer of the Royal Navy

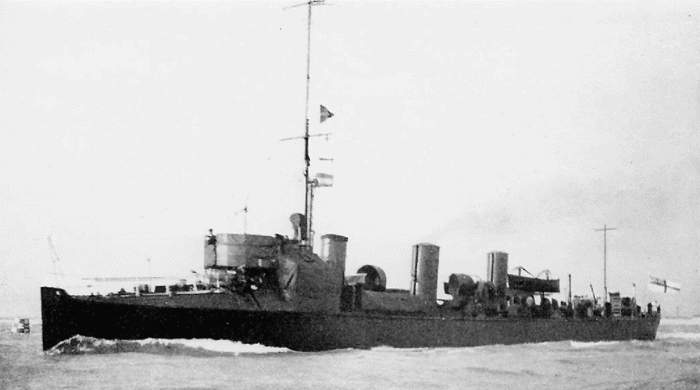

History

United Kingdom
- Name: HMS Velox
- Builder: Hawthorn Leslie and Company
- Laid down: 10 January 1901
- Launched: 11 February 1902
- Commissioned: February 1904
- Fate: Mined 25 October 1915

General characteristics
- Class & type: Viper-class torpedo boat destroyer
- Displacement: 400 long tons (406 t) normal; 462 long tons (469 t) deep load
- Length: 215 ft 0 in (65.53 m) oa; 210 ft 0 3/8 in (64.02 m) pp
- Beam: 21 ft 0 3/8 in (6.41 m)
- Draught: 5 ft 11 in (1.80 m)
- Propulsion: Parsons turbines,
- Speed: 27 knots (50 km/h; 31 mph) (full load)
- Complement: 63
- Armament: 1 × 12 pounder gun; 5 × 6 pounder guns; 2 × torpedo tubes

HMS Velox was a turbine-powered torpedo boat destroyer (or "TBD") of the British Royal Navy built on speculation in 1901-04 by engineering firm Parsons Marine, with the hull subcontracted to Hawthorn Leslie and Company at Hebburn on the River Tyne. Velox served in the First World War, being sunk by striking a mine in 1915.

== Design and construction ==
The British Admiralty, eager to investigate the use of steam turbines in warships, ordered the experimental destroyer Viper from Parsons Marine in 1898, and purchased Cobra, also turbine-powered, built as a private venture by Armstrong Whitworth, in 1900. Both ships were quickly lost however, with Viper running aground off Alderney on 3 August 1901, and Cobra broke in half while on her delivery voyage on 19 September 1901. The Admiralty was still keen to adopt turbines, and so decided to buy a turbine-powered destroyer that was being built as a private venture by Parsons, the Python. (Note: The Admiralty also ordered turbine-powered members of the River-class destroyers, (Eden) and the Topaze-class cruisers (Amethyst).)

The hull of Python had been laid down at Hawthorn Leslie and Company's Hebburn, Tyneside shipyard (as for Viper, Parsons had sub-contracted build of the hull to Hawthorn Leslie, with the ship's machinery to be provided by Parsons) on 10 April 1901 and launched on 11 February 1902.

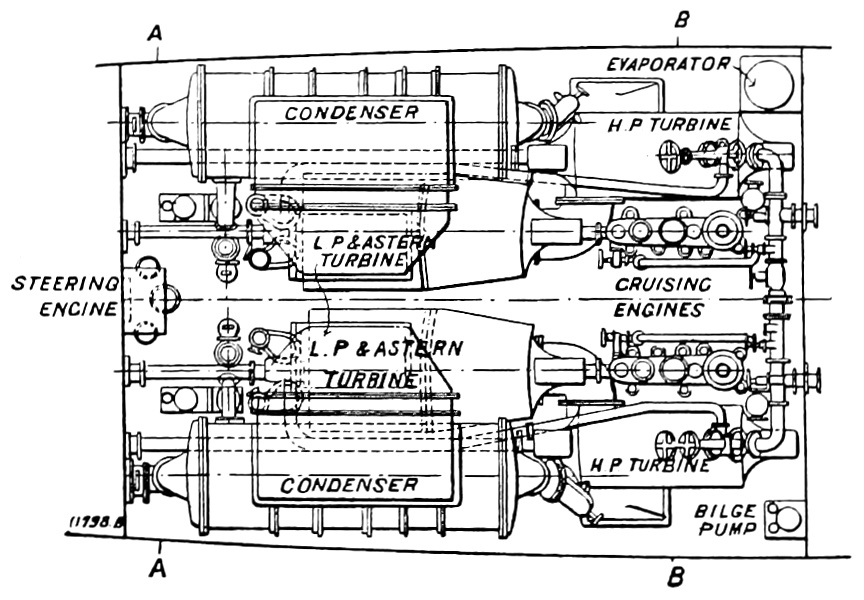
A plan view of the machinery layout of HMS Velox as built

The ship was powered by two sets of compound steam turbines, each consisting of a high-pressure and low-pressure turbine driving a separate propeller shaft, with the high-pressure turbines driving the outer shafts and the low-pressure turbines the inner shafts giving four shafts in all. Two propellers were fitted to each shaft. (Note: Sources differ as to the power of Velox's machinery. An article in the 1906–07 Jane's Fighting Ships gives a power of 7,000 indicated horsepower (5,200 kW), while Brassey's Naval Annual and Manning give a power of 8,000 horsepower (6,000 kW). Lyon does not quote a power for the turbines, while both Conway's All The World's Fighting Ships 1860–1905 and Friedman state that the power is unknown.) A new feature was that a pair of small triple expansion engines (rated at 150 indicated horsepower (110 kW) each) that could be coupled to the inner, low-pressure turbine shafts for efficient cruising. Parsons were prepared to guarantee that the ship could reach a speed of 32 knots (59 km/h; 37 mph) forward and 12 knots (22 km/h; 14 mph) astern during sea trials, but hoped for speeds of 33 3/4 knots (62.5 km/h; 38.8 mph) and 16 knots (30 km/h; 18 mph) respectively.

The ship was 215 feet 0 inches (65.53 m) long overall and 210 ft 0 3/8 in (64.02 m) between perpendiculars, with a beam of 21 feet 0 3/8 inch (6.41 m) and a draught of 5 feet 11 inches (1.80 m). Displacement was 400 long tons (406 t) normal and 462 long tons (469 t) deep load. As well as the normal rudder at the ship's stern, a retractable rudder was fitted forward to aid manoeuvrability when running astern. Three funnels were fitted, while the ship's crew consisted of 63 officers and men. Armament was the standard for the thirty-knotters, i.e. a QF 12 pounder 12 cwt (Note: "Cwt" is the abbreviation for hundredweight, 12cwt referring to the weight of the gun.) (3 in (76 mm) calibre) gun on a platform on the ship's conning tower (in practice the platform was also used as the ship's bridge), with a secondary armament of five 6-pounder guns, and two 18 inch (450 mm) (Note: British "18 inch" torpedoes were actually 17.72 inches (45.0 cm) in diameter, beginning with the "Fiume" Whitehead torpedo of 1890.) torpedo tubes.

The Admiralty signed a contract for Python in May 1902, renaming the ship HMS Velox. (Note: The loss of Viper and Cobra in just over a month strengthened existing superstitions that naming ships after snakes was unlucky.) As experience with earlier destroyers had shown that the speeds achieved in sea trials, which were run lightly loaded, were not representative of speeds in service, it was specified by the Admiralty that trials should instead be carried out fully loaded. Velox was the first destroyer to be affected by this policy, which caused Parsons to cut the guaranteed speed to 27 knots (50 km/h; 31 mph).

Sea trials showed that Velox was as fast as hoped, reaching a speed of 34.5 knots (63.9 km/h; 39.7 mph) at light load, and when fully loaded as according to contract requirements, making 27.249 knots (50.465 km/h; 31.358 mph) over the measured mile and an average speed of 27.142 knots (50.267 km/h; 31.234 mph). Fuel consumption was significantly higher than expected, however, being up to 80% higher than the normal thirty knotters. Velox was commissioned in February 1902.

== Service ==
Velox was not a success in service, partly due to the very high fuel consumption. This was not helped by the fact that the cruising engines could only drive the ship at 10.35 knots (19.17 km/h; 11.91 mph) which was less than the cruising speed of the fleet. Other problems included slow astern speeds (about 5 knots (9.3 km/h; 5.8 mph) only) together with an inability to quickly change the engines to run astern and problems associated with the location of the condensers. The cruising engines were replaced by cruising turbines in 1907.

In May 1909, Velox was passing Lands End when her port engines failed and heavy rolling caused a loss of feedwater supply to her condensers. This almost caused a complete loss of power off a dangerous lee shore. After this incident, Velox was transferred from normal flotilla duty to be attached to HMS Vernon, the Royal Navy's torpedo establishment as a training vessel. As such, Velox would not need to operate in poor weather which could cause a similar failure.

On 30 August 1912 the Admiralty directed all destroyers were to be grouped into classes designated by letters based on contract speed and appearance. As a three-funneled destroyer, Velox was assigned to the C Class.

Velox remained attached to HMS Vernon on the outbreak of the First World War in August 1914. In January 1915, Velox was assigned to the local patrol flotilla at Portsmouth.

On 25 October 1915, the ship was on patrol with the destroyer Conflict when condenser problems forced Velox to seek calmer waters near the Isle of Wight. She struck a mine laid by the German submarine UC-5 off the Nab Lightship, killing four crewmen and badly damaging the ship's stern. Attempts to tow Velox to safety were unsuccessful, and Velox foundered.

== Conservation and Recovery Efforts ==
The site of HMS Velox lies approximately 1.5 miles east of Bembridge on the southern margin of the east The Solent. While much of the wreckage has already been recovered, divers continue to recover artifacts from the site. The Maritime Archaeology Trust began sponsoring recovery and conservation efforts at the site of the Velox in 2010, and continues to sponsor similar efforts at other shipwreck sites of cultural importance.

== Pennant numbers ==
Pennant number	From	To
P45	6 Dec 1914	1 Sep 1915
D71	1 Sep 1915	Loss
