= Viper-class destroyer =

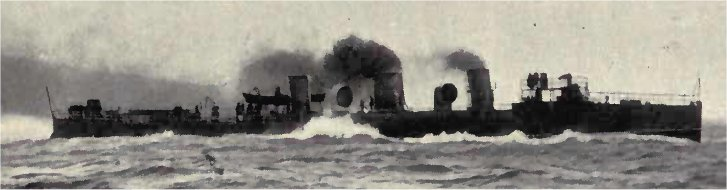
- HMS Viper

Class overview
- Builders: Hawthorn Leslie and Company
- Operators: Royal Navy
- In commission: 1899–1915
- Completed: 2
- Lost: 2

General characteristics
- Type: Torpedo boat destroyer
- Displacement: 344 long tons (350 t)
- Length: 210 ft (64 m)
- Beam: 21 ft (6.4 m)
- Draught: 7 ft (2.1 m)
- Propulsion: Parsons turbines, 10,000 ihp (7,457 kW)
- Speed: 36.5 knots (67.6 km/h; 42.0 mph)
- Complement: 68
- Armament: 1 × 12 pounder gun; 5 × 6 pounder guns; 2 × torpedo tubes

The Viper class was a group of two torpedo boat destroyers (or "TBDs") built for the British Royal Navy in 1899.

They were notable for being the first warships to use steam turbine propulsion. They had Parsons turbines on four shafts, with two propellers on each, one inboard and one outboard of the shaft A-bracket.

Viper was ordered and built for the Royal Navy in 1899 by Hawthorn Leslie and Company at Hebburn on the River Tyne. Python was built as a speculative venture by Hawthorns and was purchased in 1902.

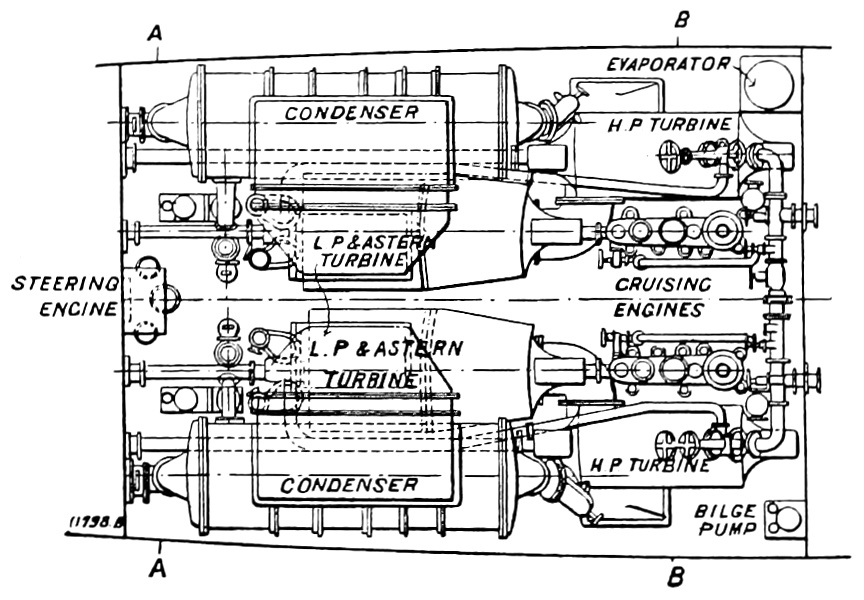
Turbine of HMS Velox

Viper and another turbine-powered ship, the Vickers special-type Cobra were both lost to accidents in 1901: Viper foundered on rocks in fog during naval manoeuvres near Alderney on 3 August 1901, while Cobra broke her back in a storm in the North Sea on 18 September 1901. Since then the Royal Navy has not used snake names for destroyers; Python was renamed Velox soon after. Velox was rated as a C-class destroyer in 1913, that is, one of a heterogeneous group of 30-knot torpedo boat destroyer with three funnels.

The ships were considered successes when acquired, achieving speeds of up to 36 knots on trials. All subsequent British destroyers from the River or E class of 1903 (only three of which employed turbines) to the County class of 1960 used steam turbine machinery, before the Royal Navy switched to navalised gas turbine engines.

== Ships ==
- Viper, launched 6 September 1899, wrecked near Alderney on 3 August 1901.
- Python, later renamed Velox, launched 11 February 1902, mined and sunk off Nab light vessel, 25 October 1915.
