= Turbinia =

First steam turbine-powered steamship, built in 1894

Coordinates: 54°58′8.9″N 1°37′28.2″W

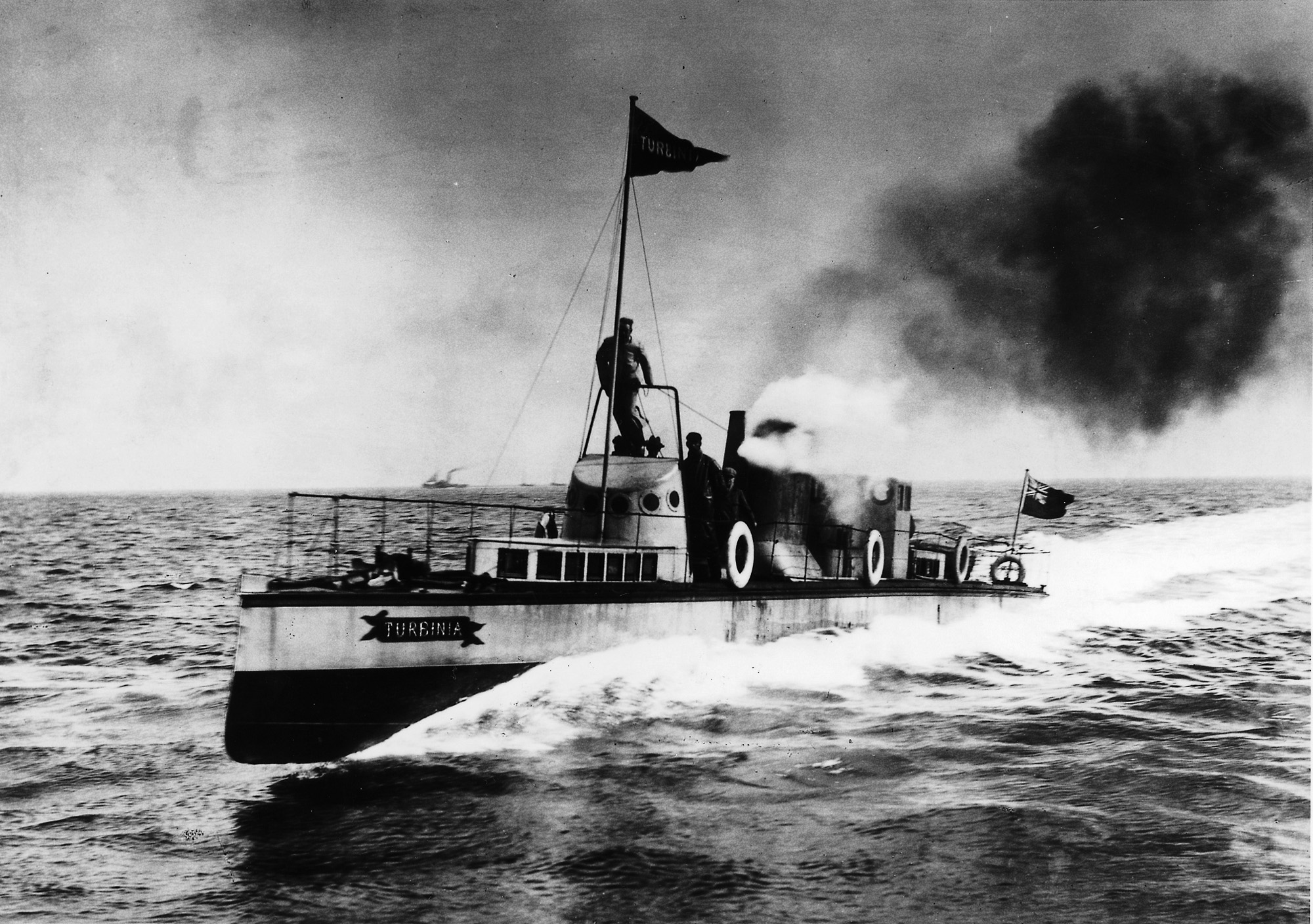
- Turbinia at speed in 1897

History

United Kingdom
- Name: Turbinia
- Builder: Sir Charles Algernon Parsons
- Launched: 2 August 1894
- Out of service: 1927
- Refit: 1960s
- Nickname(s): "The Ocean Greyhound"
- Status: Museum ship

General characteristics
- Displacement: 44.5 long tons (45.2 t)
- Length: 104 ft 9 in (31.93 m)
- Beam: 9 ft (2.7 m)
- Draught: 3 ft (0.91 m)
- Installed power: 1 water-tube boiler; 2,100 hp (1,600 kW)
- Propulsion: Three uniquely-staged (HP/SS;IP/PS;LP/Center) axial-flow direct-acting Parsons steam turbines driving two 12 ft 6 in (3.81 m) outer shafts, each with three 18-inch-diameter (460 mm), 24-inch-pitch (610 mm) propellers, and one inner shaft with three propellers; 200 psi (1.4 MPa), 170 psi (1.2 MPa) at the turbine
- Speed: 34.5 knots (63.9 km/h; 39.7 mph)

Turbinia is the first steam turbine-powered steamship. Built as an experimental vessel in 1894 by Sir Charles Algernon Parsons, and easily the fastest ship in the world at that time, Turbinia was demonstrated dramatically at the Spithead Navy Review in 1897 and set the standard for the next generation of steamships, the majority of which would be turbine powered. The vessel is currently located at the Discovery Museum in Newcastle upon Tyne, North East England, while her original powerplant is located at the Science Museum in London.

== Development ==
Charles Algernon Parsons invented the modern steam turbine in 1884, and having foreseen its potential to power ships, he set up the Parsons Marine Steam Turbine Company in 1897. To develop this, he had the experimental vessel Turbinia built in a light design of steel by the firm of Brown and Hood, based at Wallsend on Tyne in the North East of England.

The Admiralty was kept informed of developments, and Turbinia was launched on 2 August 1894. Despite the success of the turbine engine, initial trials with one propeller were disappointing. After discovering the problem of cavitation and constructing the first cavitation tunnel, Parsons' research led to his fitting three axial-flow turbines to three shafts, each shaft in turn driving three propellers, giving a total of nine propellers. In trials, this achieved a top speed of more than 34 knots (63 km/h; 39 mph), so that "the passengers aboard would be convinced beyond all doubt Turbinia was Charles Parsons' winning North Sea greyhound".

The turbines were directly driven, as geared turbines were not introduced until 1910. Even after the introduction of geared turbines, efficiency of even the largest axial steam turbines was still below 12% and Turbinia was even less efficient. Despite this, it was a dramatic improvement over predecessors.

== Demonstration ==
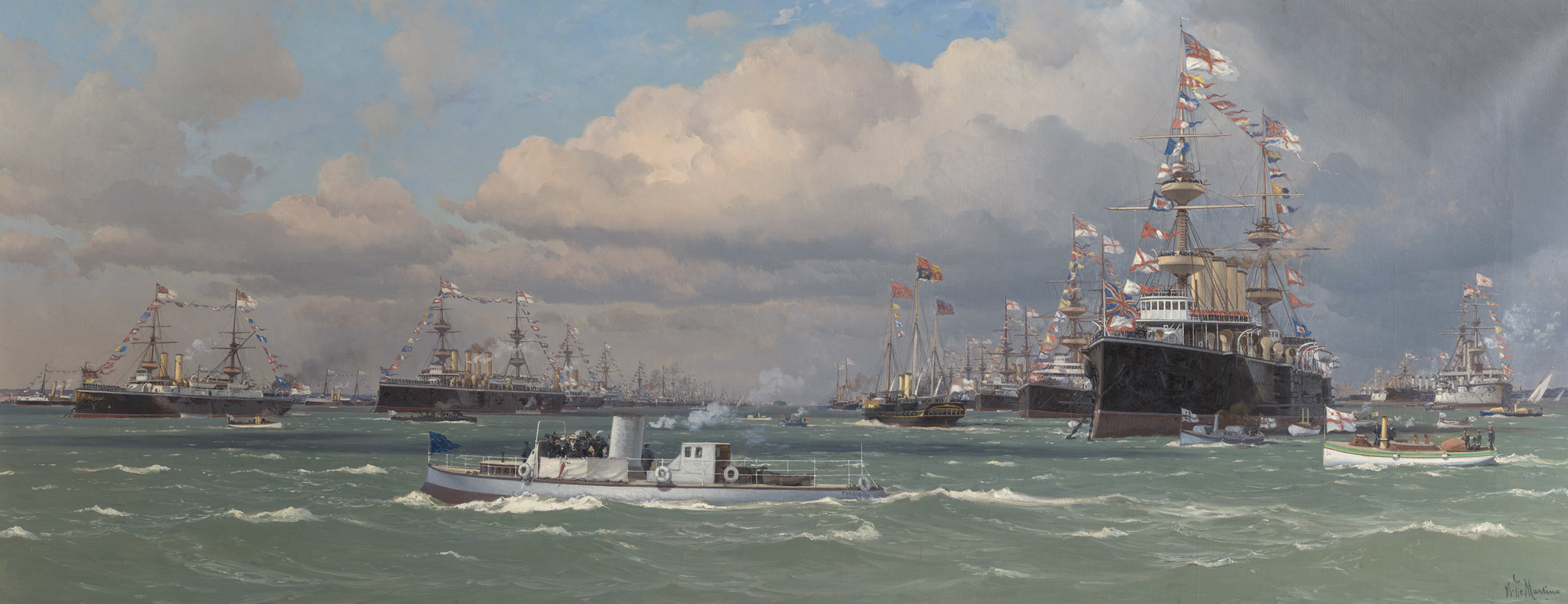
Turbinia at the Spithead Navy Review, 1897

Parsons' ship turned up unannounced at the Navy Review for the Diamond Jubilee of Queen Victoria at Spithead, on 26 June 1897, in front of the Prince of Wales, foreign dignitaries, and Lords of the Admiralty. As an audacious publicity stunt, Turbinia, which was much faster than any other ship at the time, raced between the two lines of navy ships and steamed up and down in front of the crowd and princes, while easily evading a navy picket boat that tried to pursue her, almost swamping it with her wake.

Photographer and cinematographer Alfred J. West took several photographs of Turbinia travelling at full speed at the review. He was subsequently invited by Sir Charles Parsons to film and photograph the vessel within the River Tyne and the adjacent North Sea; the pictures captured remain the defining image of Turbinia at speed.

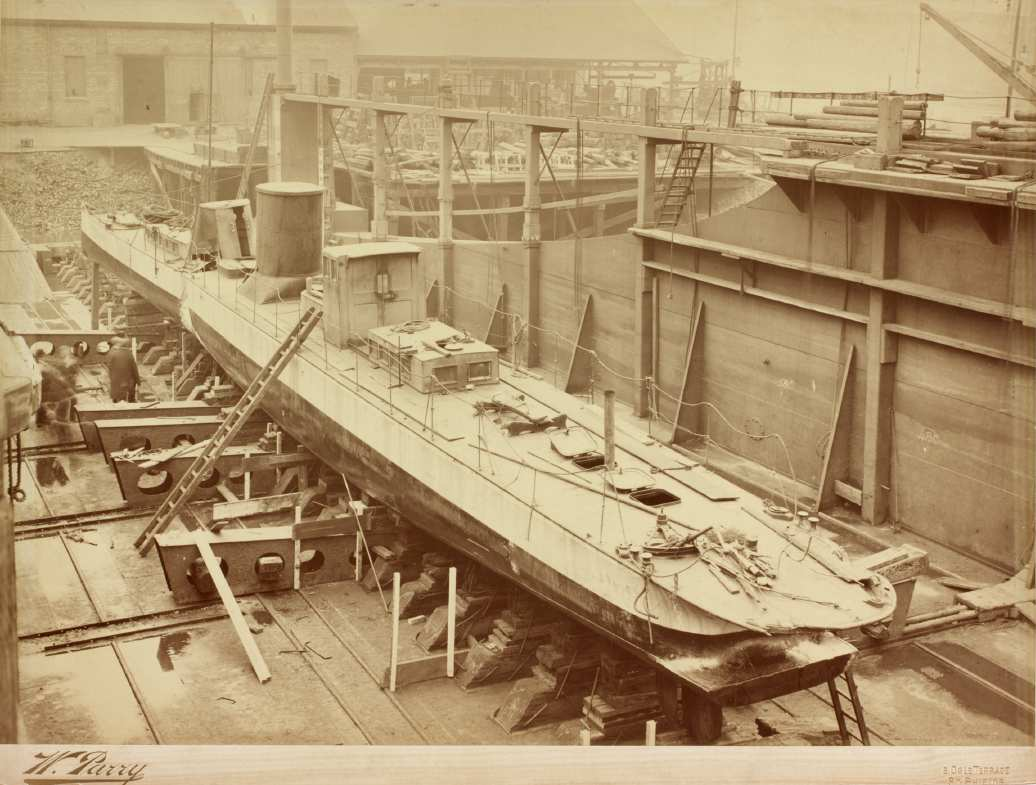
The damaged Turbinia lying in dry dock

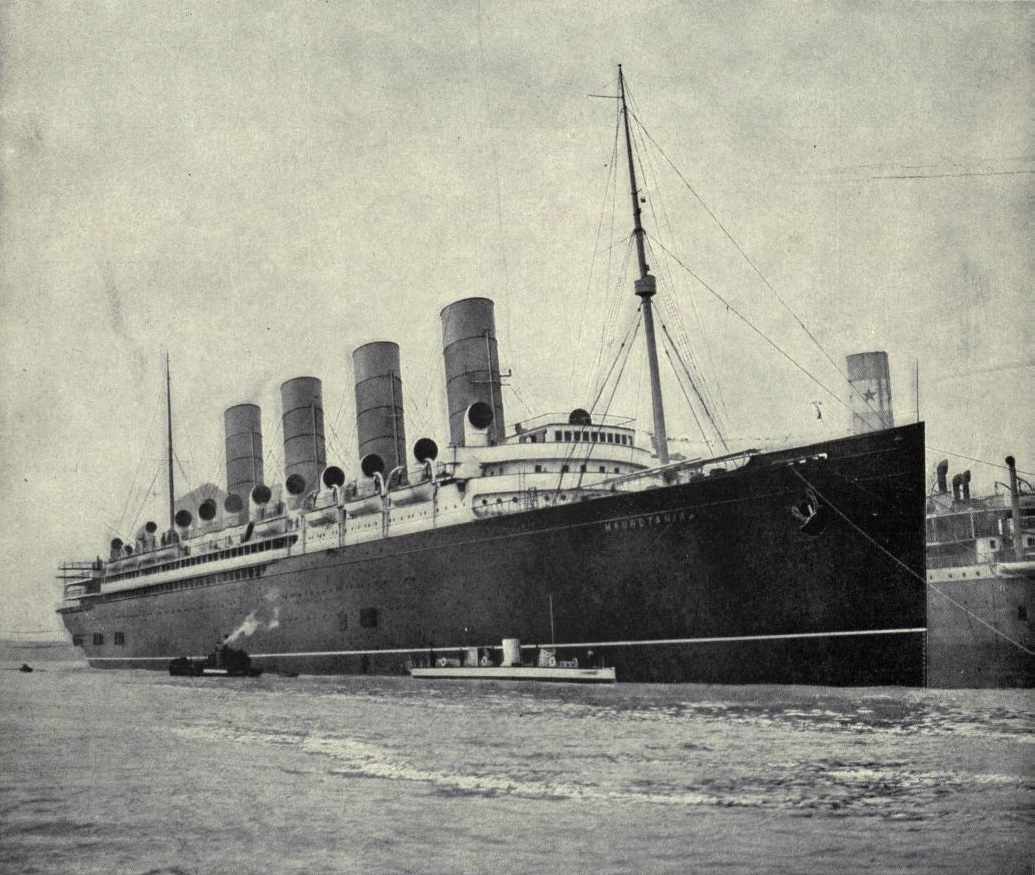
Turbinia alongside RMS Mauretania

From this clear demonstration of her speed and power and after further high speed trials attended by the Admiralty, Parsons set up the Turbinia Works at Wallsend, which then constructed the engines for two prototype turbine-powered destroyers for the Navy, HMS Viper and HMS Cobra, that were launched in 1899. Both vessels were lost to accidents in 1901, but although their losses slowed the introduction of turbines, the Admiralty had been convinced. In 1900, Turbinia steamed to Paris and was shown to French officials, and then displayed at the Paris Exhibition.

The first turbine-powered merchant vessel, the Clyde steamer TS King Edward, followed in 1901. The Admiralty confirmed in 1905 that all future Royal Navy vessels were to be turbine-powered, and in 1906, the first turbine-powered battleship, the revolutionary HMS Dreadnought, was launched.

== Crosby incident ==
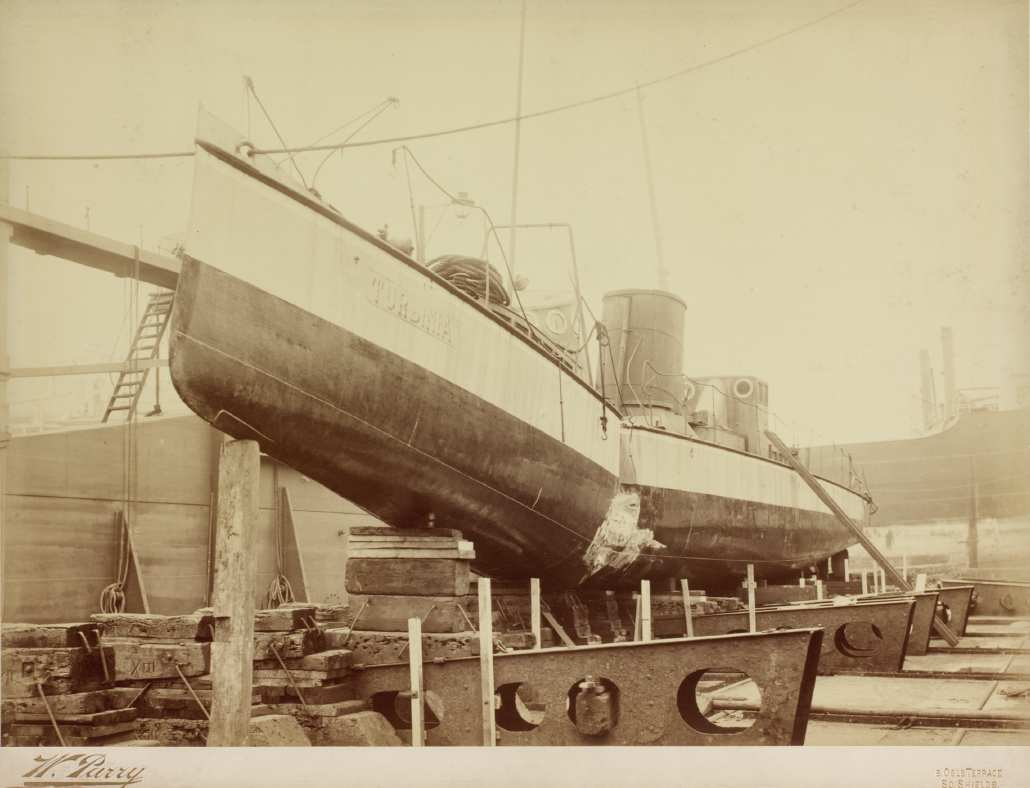
Turbinia after being hit by Crosby

On 11 January 1907, Turbinia was struck and nearly cut in two by Crosby (Note: The website Tyne Built Ships lists a vessel, Crossby (note double-s), being launched at Hebburn on 11 January 1907.) – a ship being launched across-river from the south bank of the Tyne. She was repaired and steamed alongside RMS Mauretania (also a turbine-powered vessel) after the launch of the great ocean liner. However, mechanical problems prevented Turbinia from accompanying Mauretania down the River Tyne to the sea.

== As a museum ship ==
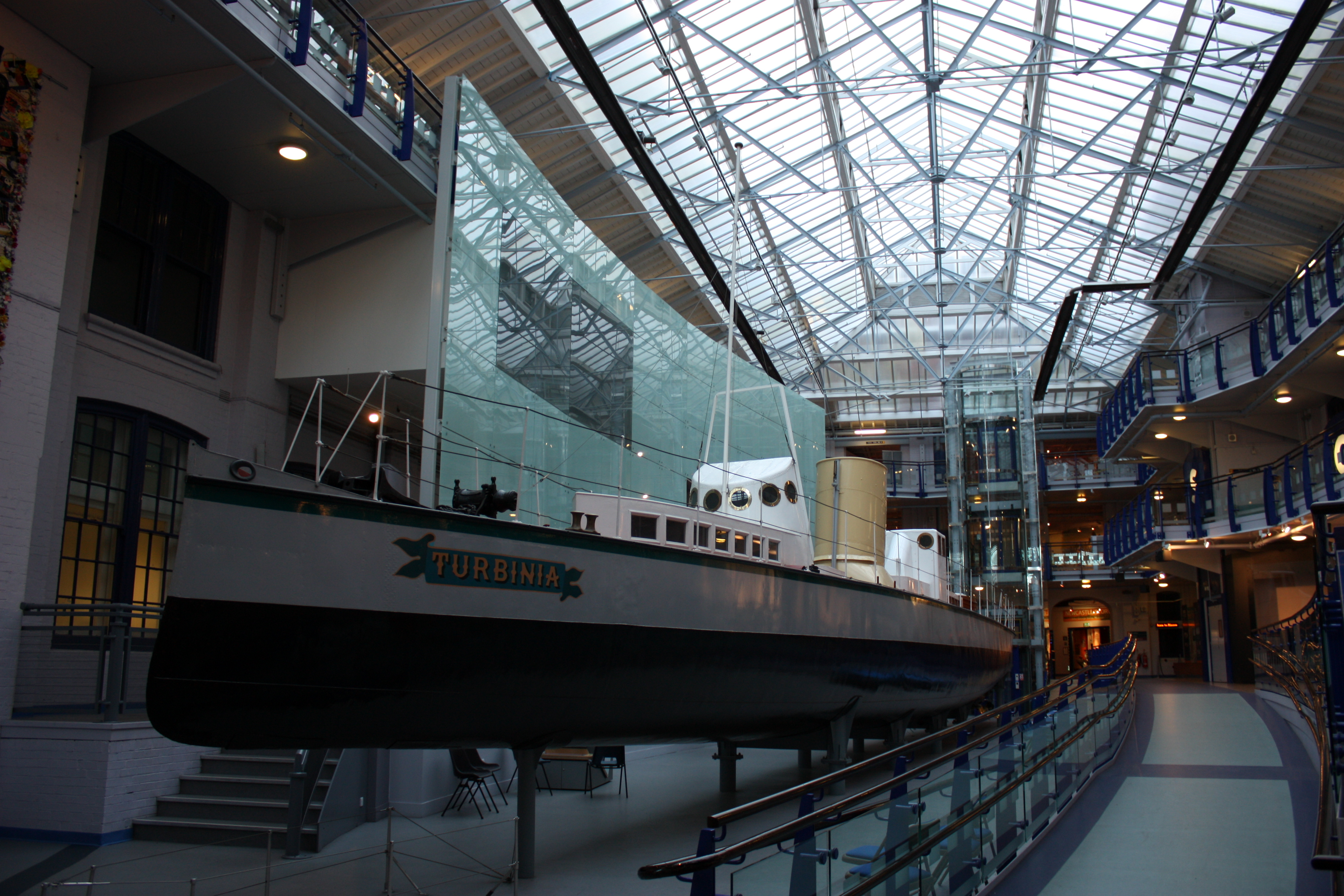
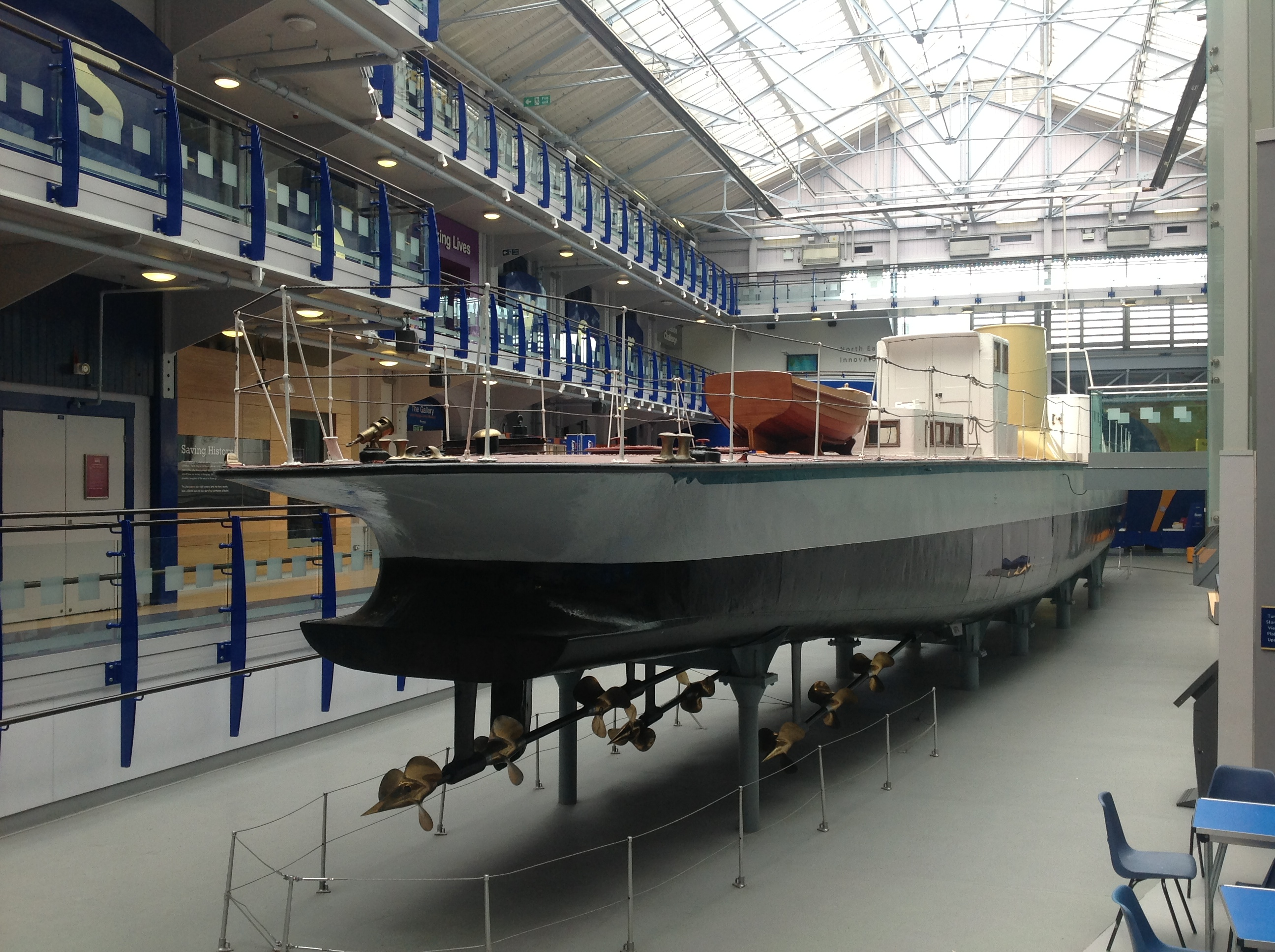
Turbinia on display at Newcastle Discovery Museum.

The company decided to slow down the deterioration of Turbinia by lifting her out of the water in 1908, and in 1926, the directors of the Parsons Marine Steam Turbine Company offered the ship to the Science Museum, London. Turbinia was sectioned in to two halves, the rear complete with engines and propellers, was put on display in the South Kensington museum in London, which did not have the space to accommodate the full ship. The fore section was presented in 1944 to Newcastle Corporation, and placed on display in the city's Exhibition Park. In 1959, the Science Museum removed the aft section of Turbinia from display, and by 1961, using a reconstructed centre section, Turbinia was reassembled and displayed in the Newcastle Municipal Museum of Science and Industry. In 1983, a complete reconstruction was undertaken.

On 30 October 1994, 100 years after her launch, Turbinia was moved to Newcastle's Museum of Science and Engineering (later renamed the Discovery Museum) and put on display to the public in March 1996. Listed as part of the National Historic Fleet, in 2000, the vessel was the focal point of a year-long, £10.7 million redevelopment programme at the Discovery Museum. The gallery around Turbinia was the first area to be refurbished, with the main part of the work involving raising the roof by one storey to create viewing galleries on three levels.

== Bibliography ==
- Brown, Les (2023). Royal Navy Torpedo Vessels. Barnsley, UK: Seaforth Publishing. ISBN 978-1-3990-2285-9.
