= HMS Viper (1899) =

Destroyer of the Royal Navy

Coordinates: 49.7333°N 2.2667°W

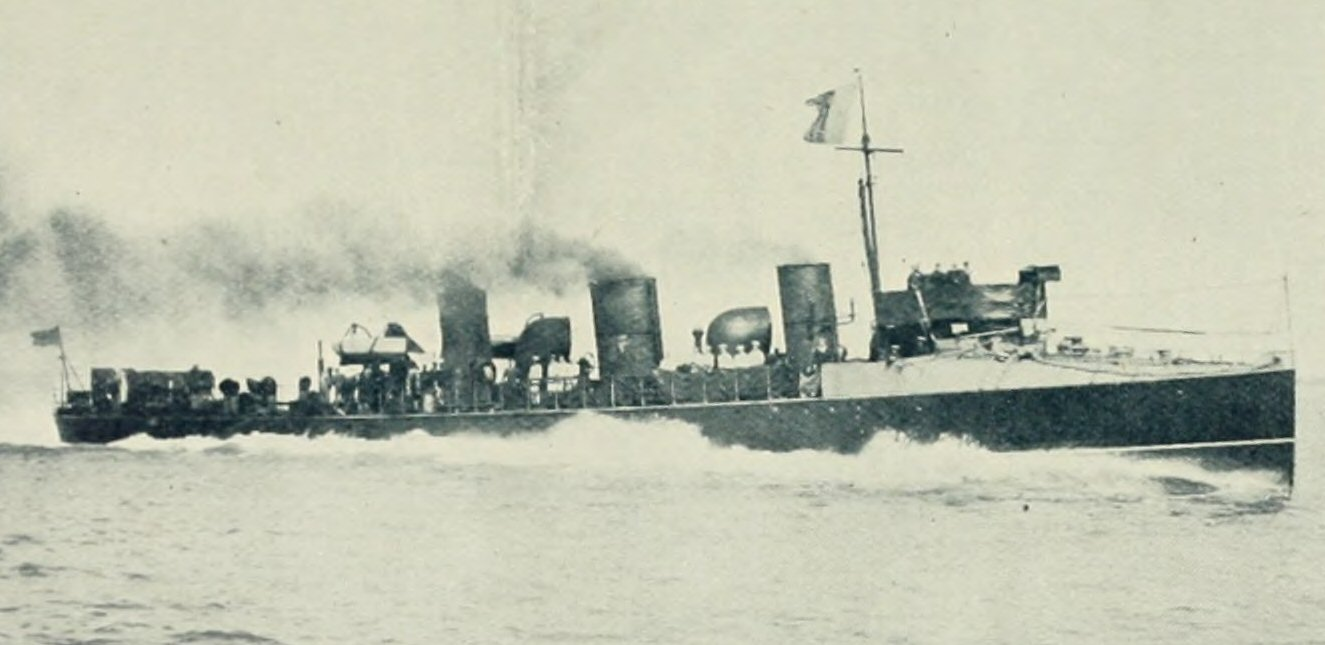
- Viper

History

United Kingdom
- Name: Viper
- Ordered: 4 March 1898
- Builder: Hawthorn Leslie and Company
- Laid down: 1898
- Launched: 6 September 1899
- Commissioned: 1900
- Fate: Struck rocks near Alderney, 3 August 1901

General characteristics
- Class & type: Viper-class torpedo boat destroyer
- Displacement: 344 long tons (350 t) normal; 393 long tons (399 t) deep load
- Length: 210 ft 3 1/2 in (64.10 m)
- Beam: 21 ft (6.40 m)
- Draught: 9 ft 9 in (2.97 m)
- Propulsion: Parsons turbines, 10,600 ihp (7,904 kW)
- Speed: 33.8 knots (63 km/h; 39 mph)
- Complement: 68
- Armament: 1 × 12 pounder gun; 5 × 6 pounder guns; 2 × torpedo tubes

HMS Viper was a Viper-class torpedo boat destroyer (or "TBD") built for the British Royal Navy in 1899 by Hawthorn Leslie and Company at Hebburn on the River Tyne.

She was notable for being the first warship to use steam turbine propulsion and was manufactured by Parsons Marine. There were four shafts, with two propellers on each, one inboard and one outboard of the shaft A-bracket.

Viper and another turbine-powered ship, the Armstrong Whitworth special-type Cobra were both lost to accidents in 1901: Viper foundered on rocks in fog during naval manoeuvres near Alderney on 3 August 1901, while Cobra broke her back in a storm in the North Sea on 18 September 1901.

== Construction and design ==
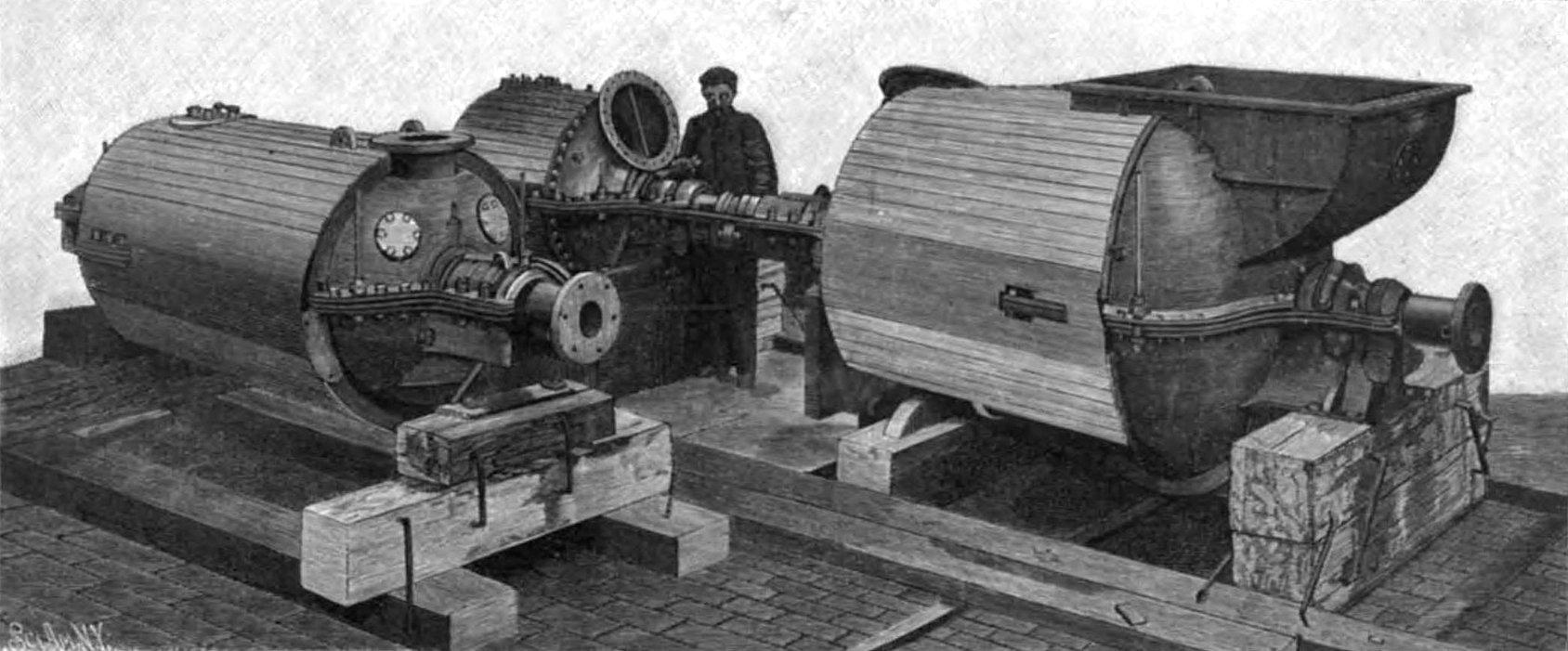
A set of Viper's turbines, showing (foreground) high-pressure turbine, and (background) low-pressure turbine and reversing engine mounted on the same shaft.

Following the success of the turbine-powered yacht Turbinia, the British Admiralty, whose previous attempts at acquiring destroyers faster than the standard "thirty-Knotters", the reciprocating-engined Albatross, Express and Arab had been unsuccessful, placed an order on 4 March 1898 with Parsons Marine for a turbine-powered destroyer, HMS Viper. Parsons subcontracted the ship's hull to Hawthorn Leslie and Company of Tyneside, with Viper being laid down later that year.

The turbines, supplied by Parsons, drove four shafts, with two propellers per shaft. The outer shafts were driven by high-pressure turbines and the inner shafts by low-pressure turbines, while the inner pair also was fitted with separate turbines for running astern. No cruising engines were fitted. Four Yarrow boilers fed the turbines, the uptakes from which were routed to three funnels. The ship had a contract speed of 31 knots (57 km/h; 36 mph), although Parsons expected the ship to reach speeds of at least 34 knots (63 km/h; 39 mph).

Viper carried a gun armament of a single QF 12 pounder 12 cwt (3 in (76 mm) calibre) gun on a platform on the ship's conning tower (in practice the platform was also used as the ship's bridge) and five 6-pounder (57 mm) guns, together with two 18 inch (450 mm) torpedo tubes, the standard armament for contemporary Royal Navy destroyers.

Viper was launched on 6 September 1899. On trials, she comfortably met the contract speed, reaching 31.017 knots (57.443 km/h; 35.694 mph) during her fuel consumption trial on 16 August 1900, and 33.57 knots (62.17 km/h; 38.63 mph) over a measured mile during full speed trials on 31 August 1900, making her the fastest destroyer in the world. Reports indicate that Viper may have reached even higher speeds during trials, variously reported as 35.5 knots (65.7 km/h; 40.9 mph) or even 36.858 knots (68.261 km/h; 42.415 mph).

While the ship's turbines allowed the ship to reach very high speeds in trials, with low levels of vibration, fuel consumption was very high, and the ship's turbines, which had been optimised for high speed, were inefficient at slower speeds. This made Viper of limited use to the Fleet, being capable of patrolling off Alderney from her base at Portland for only 24 hours before being forced to return to base due to lack of fuel.

== Loss of Viper ==
On 3 August 1901 Viper sailed from Portland to take part in a search as part of the annual fleet exercises. Arriving off Alderney's Casquet Rocks in mid-afternoon, she spent some time searching the area. Visibility was generally good, although there were patches of mist, and she was able to sight a vessel playing the 'enemy' in the exercise.

By early evening the mist had become fog and she slowed to 10 knots. At 17:23 breakers were spotted on the starboard bow and she turned to port, but found rocks all around and soon grounded. The destroyer fought clear, but soon grounded again and lost her propellers, finally drifting broadside onto the rocks. By 18:45, with the engine room flooded and Viper heeling over, she was abandoned. A local pilot's launch arrived to offer assistance and towed the boats ashore with the crew. Daylight on the following day showed her on Renonquet Rocks and beyond recovery. The damage increased until her back was broken and the bow section sheared around perpendicular to the keel.

The subsequent Court Martial found that the commanding officer, Lieutenant William Speke, had failed to exercise proper precautions while steaming in fog. Speke was reprimanded by the Court for negligence – a relatively light punishment. He was also commended, together with the ship's company, for the way in which the ship was abandoned, with no lives lost or injuries. The Court's findings included: "The nature of the duty on which the ship was employed necessitated taking unusual risks." The exercise had involved 127 warships operating within the crowded confines of the English Channel and Viper had been ordered into dangerous waters during an exercise that had been plagued with poor visibility. The navigating officer, Sub-Lieutenant Kenneth Mackenzie Grieve, was informed that he had "incurred their Lordships' displeasure", having inserted the ship's track into the log after the wreck, using courses that he admitted were "guesswork". It appears that the Admiralty took no further action against Grieve.

In December 1901 Viper's wreck was sold to Messrs. Agnes and Co., of Southampton, for £100.

== Bibliography ==
- Chesneau, Roger & Kolesnik, Eugene M., eds. (1979). Conway's All The World's Fighting Ships 1860–1905. London: Conway Maritime Press. ISBN 0-85177-133-5.
- Colledge, J. J.; Warlow, Ben (2006) [1969]. Ships of the Royal Navy: The Complete Record of All Fighting Ships of the Royal Navy from the 15th Century to the Present (3rd Rev ed.). London: Chatham Publishing. ISBN 978-1-86176-281-8. OCLC 67375475.
- Dittmar, F. J. & Colledge, J. J. (1972). British Warships 1914–1919. Shepperton, UK: Ian Allan. ISBN 0-7110-0380-7.
- Friedman, Norman (2009). British Destroyers: From Earliest Days to the Second World War. Barnsley, UK: Seaforth Publishing. ISBN 978-1-84832-049-9.
- Gardiner, Robert & Gray, Randal, eds. (1985). Conway's All The World's Fighting Ships 1906–1921. London: Conway Maritime Press. ISBN 0-85177-245-5.
- Hepper, David (2006). British Warship Losses in the Ironclad Era 1860-1919 Chatham Publishing. ISBN 978-1-86176-273-3
- Lyon, David (2001) [1996]. The First Destroyers. London: Caxton Editions. ISBN 1-84067-364-8.
- Manning, T. D. (1961). The British Destroyer. London: Putnam & Co. OCLC 6470051.
- March, Edgar J. (1966). British Destroyers: A History of Development, 1892–1953; Drawn by Admiralty Permission From Official Records & Returns, Ships' Covers & Building Plans. London: Seeley Service. OCLC 164893555.
- Osborne, Eric W. (2005). Destroyers: an illustrated history of their impact. Santa Barbara, Calif: ABC-CLIO. ISBN 1851094792.
- Timewell, H. C. (1 January 1974). "The Loss of H.M.S Viper". The Mariner's Mirror. 60 (3): 287–292. doi:10.1080/00253359.1974.10657976. ISSN 0025-3359.
