= HMS Cobra =

Turbine-powered destroyer of the Royal Navy

Coordinates: 53°26′N 1°06′E

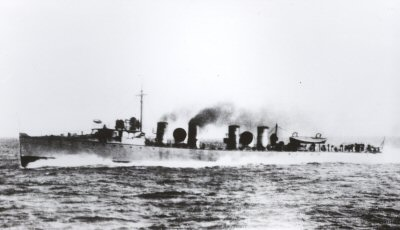
- HMS Cobra

History

United Kingdom
- Name: HMS Cobra
- Builder: Armstrong Whitworth
- Launched: 28 June 1899
- Acquired: 8 May 1900
- Fate: Sank near Cromer, 18 September 1901

General characteristics
- Type: Destroyer
- Displacement: 400 long tons (410 t)
- Length: 223 ft (68 m)
- Installed power: 11,500 shp (8,600 kW)
- Propulsion: Parsons turbines; Yarrow boilers; 4 × shafts
- Speed: 36.6 knots (67.8 km/h; 42.1 mph)
- Armament: 1 × 12 pdr (5.4 kg) gun; 5 × 6 pdr (2.7 kg) guns; 2 × torpedo tubes

HMS Cobra was a turbine-powered destroyer of the Royal Navy. She was built speculatively by Armstrong Whitworth and then offered for sale to the British Admiralty. She was launched on 28 June 1899, and purchased by the Navy on 8 May 1900 for £70,000.

Her short career came to an end when she broke her back and sank near South Dowsing Shoal, off Ingoldmells, on 18 September 1901. The break occurred 150 ft (46 m) from her bows, between the two aft boilers. Twelve men — including the chief engineer — were saved; 44 Navy officers and men, as well as 23 staff from the contractors, mostly employees of the turbine manufacturers, Parsons Marine, were drowned.

A court-martial enquiry held in October absolved the surviving officers of all blame, finding that "Cobra did not touch the ground or come into any contact with any obstruction, nor was her loss due to any error in navigation, but was due to structural weakness of the ship." This was contested by the manufacturers and other shipbuilders, with examples of equivalent boats being navigated to Australia or Japan without incident.

The loss of Cobra came only six weeks after that of the destroyer Viper, the only other turbine-powered ship in the navy. Both ships had been intended as trial vessels to demonstrate the capabilities of the new technology. Neither loss was caused by problems with the turbines, but the losses were still a setback for the general introduction of turbines into warships. The losses came after the loss of Serpent in 1890 and created an aversion in the Royal Navy towards snake names, and these names were not reused.

== History ==
On 27 May 1898, Armstrong Whitworth laid down a turbine-powered destroyer at their Elswick, Newcastle upon Tyne shipyard as a private venture (i.e. without an order) as Yard number 674, with the ship being launched on 28 June 1899. Cobra was constructed by Armstrong Whitworth and company as a private venture and was one of two which it offered for sale to the British Admiralty on 12 December 1899. Ship number 674 was fitted with Parsons Marine turbines similar to those installed in the destroyer Viper. Such engines were expected to be 60% more powerful than reciprocating engines usually fitted to similar ships at that time. There were four shafts from the engines, each driving three propellers. The overall design was based on that for the destroyers Swordfish and Spitfire recently built in the same yard. The Director of Naval Construction, Sir William Henry White inspected the vessel and although considering it to be less strong than would have been the case had it been specified by the navy, could find no particular objections to its hull design. It was considered that the Admiralty should purchase it rather than permit its sale to a foreign navy.

=== The shipwreck ===
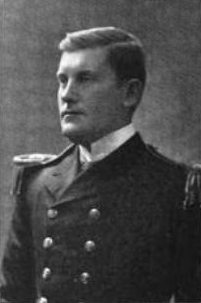
Lieutenant Alan Wyldbore Bosworth Smith

The ship had her first steam trials in June 1900. She was completed including Admiralty alterations and had finished steam trials by September 1901. Lieutenant Bosworth Smith — with a crew of two officers and 48 men — was appointed to collect the ship from Newcastle and take her to Portsmouth where she would be fitted with guns and ammunition. She left Elswick at 11:00 on 17 September, proceeding down the river Tyne, where the crew adjusted the compass, reaching the mouth of the river by only 19:00 and then taking a course S 25° E at about 17 kn (20 mph; 31 km/h). Wind from the NNW and a rough sea caused the ship to roll heavily, so that there was difficulty feeding coal to the boilers and two had to be extinguished, reducing speed to 5 kn (5.8 mph; 9.3 km/h) by around 22:00. Stoker John Collins reported that in the early morning of the 18th, the crew could hardly stand in the stokehold. By dawn on the 18th, it was possible to increase speed to 8 kn (9.2 mph; 15 km/h). At 07:00, the 'Outer Dowsing' lightvessel was seen about 3 mi (4.8 km) away. Cobra altered course towards the light to confirm its identity and was seen approaching by crewmembers of the lightvessel. Its crew reported that Cobra was seen to be "plunging heavily", then stopped in a cloud of steam, before breaking in two. The stern section sank, while the bow continued to drift in the wind.

Chief Engineer Percey from Cobra stated that around 07:15, he was in the engine room and felt an impact as though the ship had hit something. He went on deck and discovered that the ship was breaking in two, he being on the aft part. An attempt was made to launch the ship's whaler, but this capsized from overcrowding as 40-50 men tried to get aboard. There were three collapsible boats, but there was insufficient time to assemble them before the ship sank. A 14 ft (4.3 m) dinghy was successfully launched containing Petty Officer Francis Barns and seven others. Barns threw out everything he could from the dinghy and managed to get onboard four more survivors, including Percey. Three of these had to stay in the water holding the side of the boat for three hours until the sea had calmed enough to get them aboard. It was reported that another sailor, reaching the boat after an exhausting swim, saw that "if he added his weight all would be lost, so he said "It's one for many, good-bye all," and he loosed his grip, sinking to rise no more". The 12 were picked up by the steamer Harlington at about 18:15 and landed at Middlesbrough. Although men in the water had lifebelts, these were not enough to keep them from drowning in the heavy seas. Lieutenant Smith was last seen standing on the bridge as the front part of the ship sank.

John Smith, master of the steam fishing lighter '15' left Great Yarmouth harbour at 08:00 and heading towards the South Dowsing light. About 16:30, he picked up two dead men from the sea and seeing the wreck of Cobra went towards it. About 15 ft (4.6 m) of the front of the ship was sticking out of the water, bottom uppermost. There was no sign of life around the still visible ship so he went to the lightship for information. He was asked to take news ashore about what had happened, but first returned to Cobra's whaler, which was floating upside down and recovered more bodies from the sea. On 20 September, Commander Storey of the naval vessel Hearty attempted to tow the wreck — which was still visible — into shallower water. He managed only to move it 100 yd (91 m). A Swedish diver — Mr. Frank Carlson — made several descents to the wreck, which was lying bottom up with the stem raised off the sea bed.

=== Court-martial and committee of enquiry ===
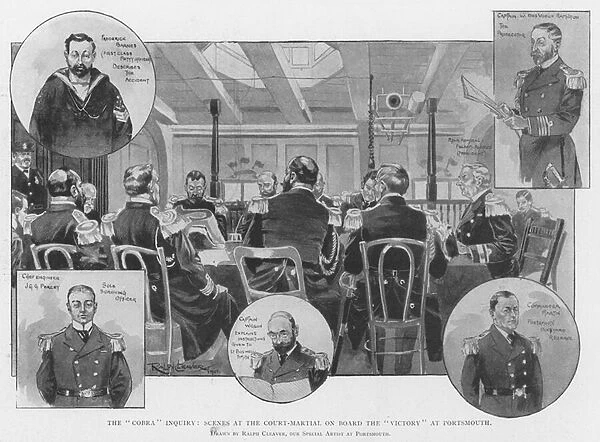
The Cobra Inquiry, scenes at the Court-Martial on board the Victory at Portsmouth. Illustrated London News 1901

A court-martial was held to investigate the sinking under the presidency of Rear-Admiral Pelham Aldrich commencing on 10 October 1901. Armstrong's general manager — Mr. Philip Watts — was called to give evidence. He was a trained naval architect and later became Director of Naval Construction at the Admiralty. He testified that the ship was slightly longer than Swordfish, thus weaker, but to compensate for this had been increased in depth making it 17% stronger. He did not consider the force of the waves was sufficient to account for the ship breaking up, and anyway the break had not occurred at the point where the hull would be weakest. He conceded that the engines had proved 28 long tons (28.4 t) heavier than had been designed for and the ship had been some 20 long tons (20.3 t) over her design weight of 450 long tons (457.2 t) when she set out. The diver had found a 1 in (2.5 cm) indentation extending along the keel plate starting a foot (30 cm) from the jagged break in the ship, although the paintwork was undamaged. Watts claimed this as evidence that the ship had struck the mast of a wrecked ship. No such wreck could be found, but Cobra's stern section also could not be located. Carpenter's Mate E. Privett testified that he had felt two slight shocks while standing on the bridge as though the ship had grounded, and that shortly afterwards the stern had risen 20-30°. Captain Shilling from the steamer Oakwell reported hitting floating wood in the nearby area. The court-martial found that the ship had broken up because of structural weaknesses, rather than from striking some object. It also criticised White for having authorised the purchase.

An enquiry was set up in November 1901 under Vice-Admiral Rawson because of ongoing concerns that if Cobra had been dangerously weak, other vessels might also be. Committee members included Dr. John Inglis, Professor John Biles, Mr. Archibald Denny and H. E. Deadman. Tests were carried out on the destroyer Wolf, which was supported in cradles before surrounding water was drained away, so that the resulting strain on the hull from support at just a few points could be measured. The results confirmed theoretical calculations that the design was sufficiently strong. Sea trials were conducted, where stresses were found to be always lower than those in the dock tests. The final conclusion was that Cobra was weaker than most similar vessels, but stronger than some. There was no reason to believe she should have broken up from wave action unless there had been some undetected major failing in the material from which she was made or in its assembly. There was no evidence of such failings during her construction.

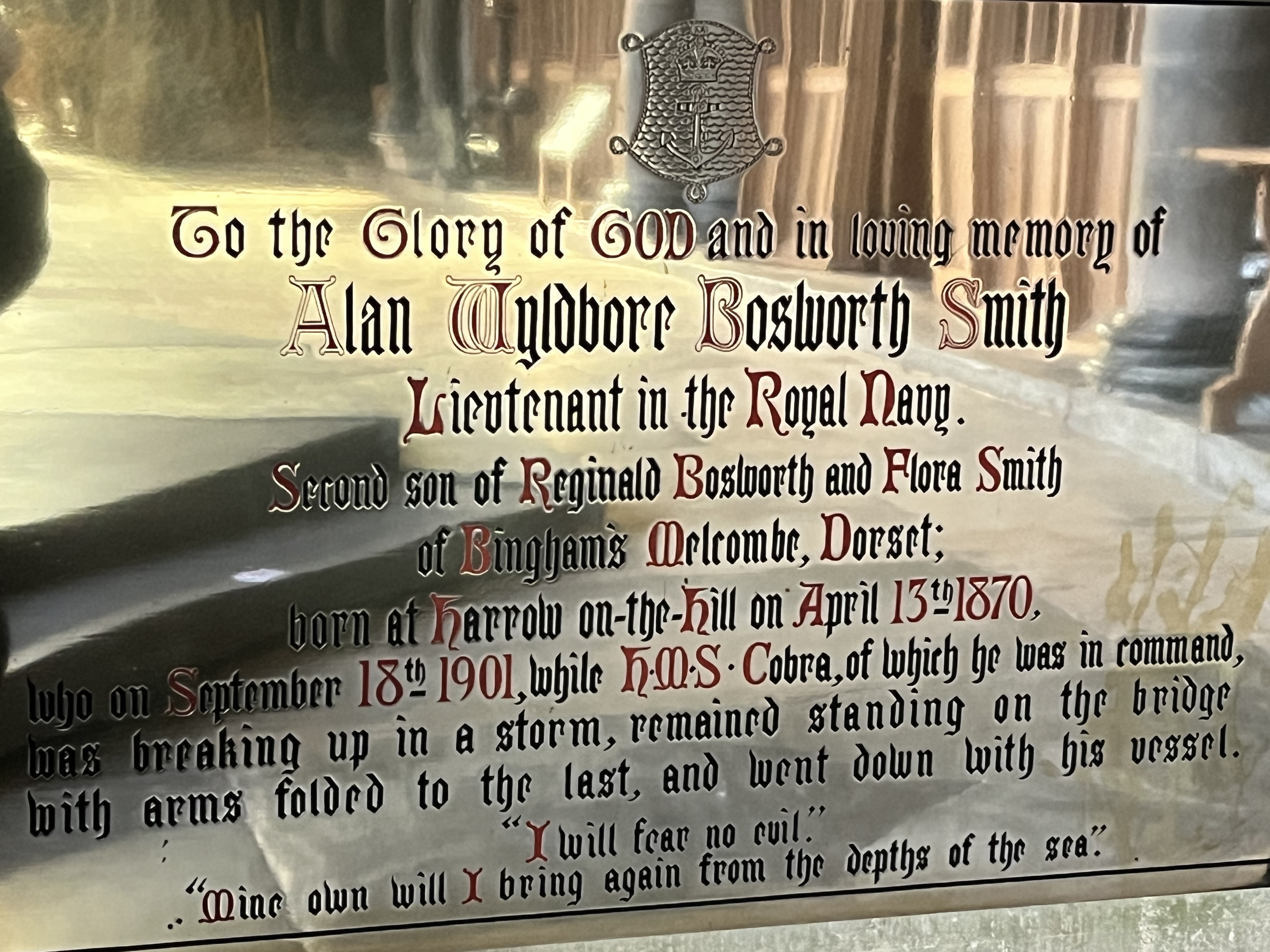
Plaque to Lt Smith in Salisbury Cathedral

The court martial and enquiry reports were classified as secret for 50 years, preventing outside experts examining the detailed evidence. In more recent times an alternative explanation of the sinking to that produced by the court-martial has been proposed. That Cobra struck timber floating in the water, first causing the denting to the keel plate, but then striking again further back along the ship at a weaker point in the bottom plating, creating a hole. This is consistent with the two shocks reported by some of the survivors. The hole allowed sufficient water to enter the ship that it reached at least the level of the boilers before she broke up. Stoker Collins reported that it was steam from flooding water having reached one of the boilers which alerted the boiler room crew to a problem, and that they evacuated the room before the ship broke in two. The added weight of this quantity of water would have been enough to break the ship in the heavy sea.

== Wreck Found ==
On 16 September 2021, the wreck was found by divers from the BSAC Jubilee Trust.

== Bibliography ==
- K. C. Barnaby (1968). Some Ship Disasters and their Causes. London: Hutchinson and Company.
- Brook, Peter (1999). Warships for Export: Armstrong Warships 1867–1927. Gravesend, UK: World Ship Society. ISBN 0-905617-89-4.
- Chesneau, Roger & Kolesnik, Eugene M., eds. (1979). Conway's All The World's Fighting Ships 1860–1905. London: Conway Maritime Press. ISBN 0-85177-133-5.
- Colledge, J. J.; Warlow, Ben (2006) [1969]. Ships of the Royal Navy: The Complete Record of All Fighting Ships of the Royal Navy from the 15th Century to the Present (3rd Rev ed.). London: Chatham Publishing. ISBN 978-1-86176-281-8. OCLC 67375475.
- Dittmar, F.J.; Colledge, J.J. (1972). British Warships 1914–1919. Shepperton, UK: Ian Allan. ISBN 0-7110-0380-7.
- Friedman, Norman (2009). British Destroyers: From Earliest Days to the Second World War. Barnsley, UK: Seaforth Publishing. ISBN 978-1-84832-049-9.
- Gardiner, Robert & Gray, Randal, eds. (1985). Conway's All The World's Fighting Ships 1906–1921. London: Conway Maritime Press. ISBN 0-85177-245-5.
- Lyon, David (2001) [1996]. The First Destroyers. London: Caxton Editions. ISBN 1-84067-3648.
- Manning, T. D. (1961). The British Destroyer. London: Putnam & Co. OCLC 6470051.
- March, Edgar J. (1966). British Destroyers: A History of Development, 1892–1953; Drawn by Admiralty Permission From Official Records & Returns, Ships' Covers & Building Plans. London: Seeley Service. OCLC 164893555.
- "The Loss Of The Cobra". The Times. No. 36566. London. 21 September 1901. p. 11 – via The Times Digital Archive.
- "The Loss Of The Cobra". The Times. No. 36567. London. 23 September 1901. p. 8 – via The Times Digital Archive.
- "The Loss Of The Cobra: Verdict Of The Court-Martial". The Times. No. 36588. London. 17 October 1901. p. 5 – via The Times Digital Archive. With subsequent correspondence in October & November.
