= Warship =

Ship that is built and primarily intended for naval warfare

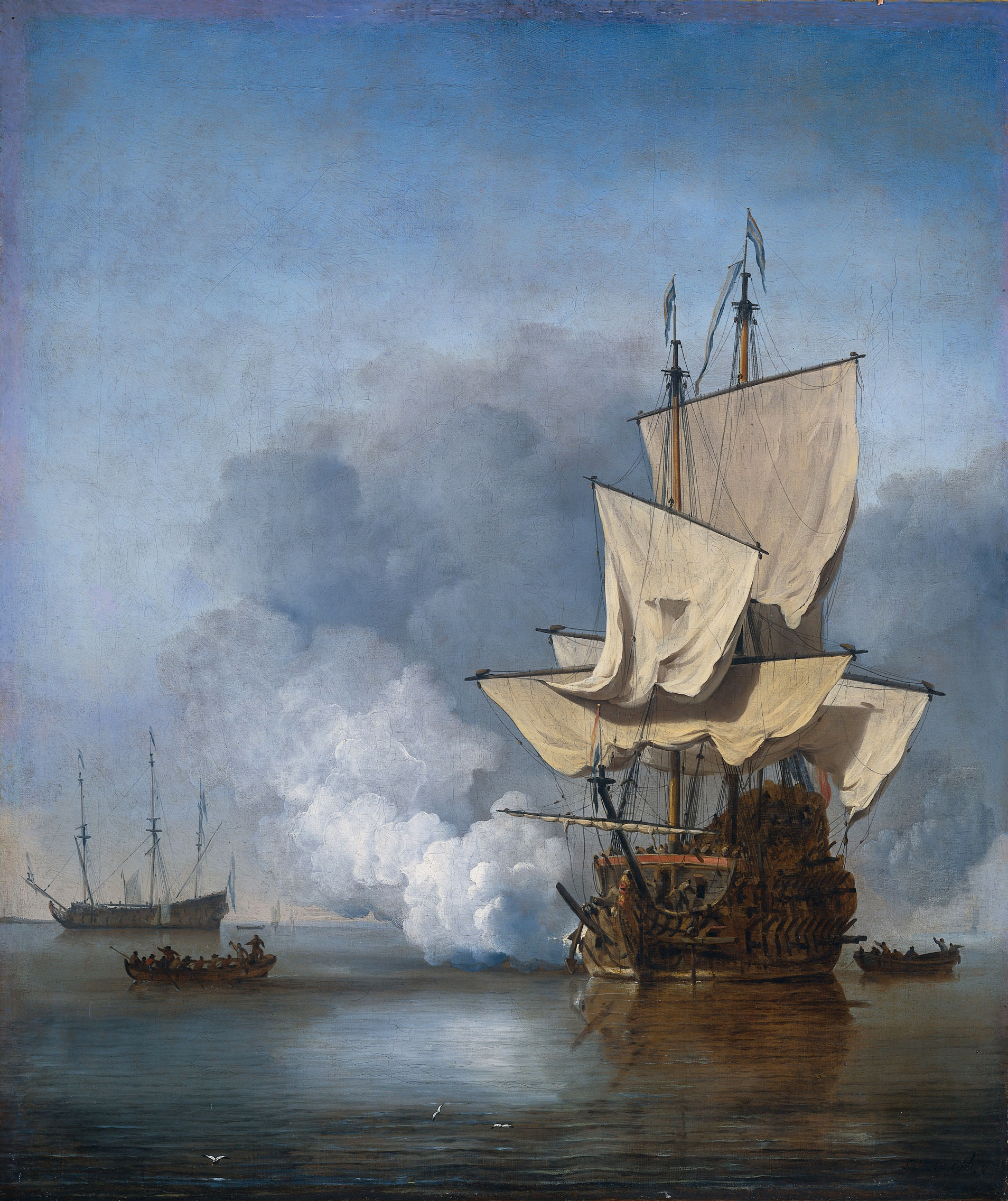
The Cannon Shot (1670) by Willem van de Velde the Younger, showing a late Dutch 17th-century ship of the line

A warship or combatant ship is a naval ship that is used for naval warfare. Usually they belong to the navy branch of the armed forces of a nation, though they have also been operated by individuals, cooperatives and corporations. As well as being armed, warships are designed to withstand damage and are typically faster and more maneuverable than merchant ships. Unlike a merchant ship, which carries cargo, a warship typically carries only weapons, ammunition and supplies for its crew.

In wartime, the distinction between warships and merchant ships is often blurred. Until the 17th century it was common for merchant ships to be pressed into naval service, and not unusual for more than half of a fleet to be composed of merchant ships—there was not a large difference in construction, unlike the difference between a heavily armoured battleship and an ocean liner. Until the threat of piracy subsided in the 19th century, it was normal practice to arm larger merchant ships such as galleons. Warships have also often been used as troop carriers or supply ships, such as by the French Navy in the 18th century or the Imperial Japanese Navy during the Second World War. In war since the early 20th century, merchant ships were often armed and used as auxiliary warships, such as the Q-ships of the First World War and the armed merchant cruisers of the Second World War.

== Types and classes ==
The main types of warships today are, in order of decreasing size: aircraft carriers – amphibious assault ships – cruisers – destroyers – frigates – corvettes – fast attack boats. A more extensive list follows:

- Submarine, are ships capable of staying submerged for days. Modern submarines can stay underwater for months, with food supplies as the only limiting factor.
  - Fleet submarine is a type of submarine with the speed, range, and endurance to operate as part of a navy's battle fleet.
  - Ballistic missile submarine is a submarine capable of deploying submarine-launched ballistic missiles (SLBMs) with nuclear warheads.
  - Cruise missile submarine are submarines equipped with cruise missiles.
  - Attack submarine is a submarine with the purpose of attacking other submarines.
  - Coastal submarine or littoral submarine is a small, maneuverable type of submarine with shallow draft well suited to navigation of coastal channels and harbors.
  - Midget submarine is any submarine under 150 tons, typically operated by a crew of one or two but sometimes up to six or nine.
  - Submarine aircraft carrier is a submarine equipped with aircraft for observation or attack missions. These submarines saw their most extensive use during World War II, although their operational significance remained small.
  - Cruiser submarine were a type of a very large submarine designed to remain at sea for extended periods in areas distant from base facilities.
- Amphibious warfare ships are warships employed to land and support ground forces, such as marines, on enemy territory during an amphibious assault.
  - Amphibious assault ship is a type of amphibious warfare ship employed to land and support ground forces with ship-deployed helicopters and V/STOL aircraft on enemy territory by an amphibious assault.
    - Landing helicopter dock is a multipurpose amphibious assault ship that is capable of operating as a helicopter carrier and also has a well deck for supporting landing crafts.
  - Amphibious transport dock is an amphibious warfare ship, that embarks, transports, and lands elements of a landing force for expeditionary warfare missions.
  - Dock landing ship is an amphibious warfare ship with a well dock to transport and launch landing craft and amphibious vehicles.
  - Landing craft are small and medium seagoing watercraft, such as boats and barges, used to convey a landing force (infantry and vehicles) from the sea to the shore during an amphibious assault.
    - Landing craft utility is a type of landing craft used by amphibious forces to transport equipment and troops to the shore. They are capable of transporting tracked or wheeled vehicles and marines from amphibious assault ships to beachheads.
    - Landing craft mechanized is a landing craft designed for carrying vehicles during amphibious assaults.
    - Landing ship, tank is the naval designation for ships first developed during World War II to support amphibious operations by carrying tanks, armoured fighting vehicles, transport vehicles, cargo, and landing troops directly onto shore with no docks or piers.
  - Landing craft support were two distinct classes of amphibious warfare vessels used by the United States Navy during World War II to support landing crafts.
- Capital ship, the largest and most important ships in a nation's fleet. These were previously battlecruisers, battleships, and aircraft carriers, but the first two warship types are now no longer used.
  - Aircraft carrier, a warship primarily armed with carrier-based aircraft.
    - Fleet carrier is an aircraft carrier designed to operate with the main fleet of a nation's navy.
    - Light aircraft carrier is an aircraft carrier that is smaller than the standard carriers of a navy.
    - Escort carrier, also called a "jeep carrier" or "baby flattop" is a slow type of aircraft carrier used during WWII.
    - Anti-submarine warfare carrier is a type of small aircraft carrier whose primary role is as the nucleus of an anti-submarine warfare hunter-killer group.
    - Aircraft cruiser (also known as aviation cruiser or cruiser-carrier) is a type of warship that combines the features of the aircraft carrier and a surface warship, such as a cruiser or battleship.
      - Helicopter cruiser.
    - Helicopter carrier, an aircraft carrier especially suited to carry helicopters and V/STOL aircraft.
    - Seaplane tender, a boat or ship that supports the operation of seaplanes. Some of these vessels, also known as seaplane carriers, could not only carry seaplanes but also provided all the facilities needed for their operation; these ships are regarded by some as the first aircraft carriers and became obsolete at the end of the Second World War.
  - Battleship, a large, heavily armored warship equipped with many powerful guns. A term which generally post-dates sailing warships.
    - Ironclad battleship, battleships built before the pre-dreadnought in the late 1850s to the early 1890s.
    - Pre-dreadnought battleship, sea-going battleships built to a common design before the launch of dreadnoughts, between the mid-1880s to the early 1900s. Pre-dreadnoughts commonly featured a mixed main battery composed of several different caliber guns.
    - Dreadnought, an early 20th-century battleship, which set the pattern for all subsequent battleship construction. Dreadnoughts differ from pre-dreadnoughts in that they feature an all-big-gun main battery. The advantage lies in that if all the big guns have the same characteristics, only one firing solution will be needed to aim them all.
      - Fast battleships were battleships which emphasized speed without – in concept – undue compromise of either armor or armament.
  - Battlecruiser, a ship with battleship-level armament and cruiser-level armour; typically faster than a battleship because the reduction in armour allowed mounting of more powerful propulsion machinery, or the use of a more slender hull shape with a lower drag coefficient.
- Cruiser, a fast, independent warship. Traditionally, cruisers were the smallest warships capable of independent action. As of 2024, only two countries operated active duty vessels formally classed as cruisers: the United States and Russia.
  - Guided missile cruisers are cruisers armed with anti-ship missiles.
  - Torpedo cruiser is a type of cruiser that is armed primarily with torpedoes.
  - Armored cruiser was a type of warship of the late 19th and early 20th centuries. It was designed like other types of cruisers to operate as a long-range, independent warship, capable of defeating any ship apart from a battleship and fast enough to outrun any battleship it encountered.
  - Large cruiser is the class of the battlecruiser-sized Alaska-class cruisers of the United States Navy during World War II.
  - Heavy cruiser was a type of cruiser, a naval warship designed for long range and high speed, armed generally with naval guns of roughly 203 mm (8 in) caliber; its parameters were dictated by the Washington Naval Treaty of 1922 and the London Naval Treaty of 1930.
    - Pocket battleship, nickname for the Deutschland-class heavy cruisers.
  - Light cruiser is a type of small or medium-sized warship. The term is a shortening of the phrase "light armored cruiser", describing a small ship that carried armor in the same way as an armored cruiser: a protective belt and deck.
  - Scout cruiser was a type of warship of the early 20th century, which were smaller, faster, more lightly armed and armoured than protected cruisers or light cruisers, but larger than contemporary destroyers. They were used for scouting.
  - Protected cruiser is a type of naval cruiser of the late-19th century, gained their description because an armored deck offered protection for vital machine-spaces from fragments caused by shells exploding above them.
  - Unprotected cruiser was a type of naval cruiser in use during the early 1870s Victorian or pre-dreadnought era.
  - Coastal defence ship were a type of cruiser-sized warship built for the purpose of coastal defense.
- Destroyer, a fast and highly maneuverable warship, traditionally incapable of independent action. Originally developed to counter the threat of torpedo boats, they are now the largest independent warship generally seen on the ocean.
  - Guided missile destroyer are destroyers armed with anti-ship missiles.
  - Escort destroyer was a small warship built to full naval standards which was optimised for air-defence and anti-submarine duties in wartime, but which retained many of the capabilities of a traditional fleet destroyer, enabling it to conduct operations in conjunction with main fleet units as well as carrying out convoy escort and ASW patrols.
  - Destroyer escort was the United States Navy mid-20th-century classification for a 20-knot (37 km/h; 23 mph), warship designed with the endurance necessary to escort mid-ocean convoys of merchant marine ships similar to frigates.
- Frigate, originally a medium-sized sailing ship. Although they date back to the 17th century, frigates in modern navies are typically used to protect merchant ships and other warships.
  - Armoured frigate are frigates with armour which was added to ships based on existing frigate and ship of the line designs. The additional weight of the armour on these first ironclad warships meant that they could have only one gun deck, and they were technically frigates, even though they were more powerful than existing ships-of-the-line and occupied the same strategic role.
  - Guided missile frigates are frigates armed with anti-ship missiles.
- Corvettes were small ships during the Age of Sail. The concept was revived again in WWII as a merchant convoy escort and anti-submarine ship. Today they are used for anti-submarine warfare and patrolling.
  - Littoral Combat Ship is a United States Navy classification of warships with the size and role of corvettes.
- Fast attack crafts are a small, fast, agile, offensive, often affordable type of warships armed with anti-ship missiles, guns or torpedoes.
  - Missile boats are small, fast warship armed with anti-ship missiles.
  - Torpedo boat, are small, fast surface vessels designed for launching torpedoes.
    - Torpedo ram is a type of torpedo boat combining a ram with torpedo tubes.
    - Motor torpedo boat is a type of fast torpedo boat, especially of the mid-20th century.
- Patrol vessels are relatively small naval vessels generally designed for coastal defence, border protection, immigration law-enforcement, search and rescue duties. They may be broadly classified as inshore patrol vessels or offshore patrol vessels.
- Mine warfare vessels:
  - Minesweeper are small warships designed to remove or detonate naval mines.
  - Minehunter are naval vessels that seek, detect, and destroys individual naval mines.
  - Mine countermeasures vessels are a type of naval ships designed for the location of and destruction of naval mines which combines the role of a minesweeper and minehunter in one hull.
  - Minelayer are naval vessels that plant naval mines offshore.
- Fire ship, a vessel of any sort set on fire and sent into an anchorage or fleet with the intention of causing destruction and chaos. Exploding fire ships are called hellburners. The development of unmanned surface vehicles has revived the use of fire ships.
- Naval drifters are boats built along the lines of a commercial fishing drifter but fitted out for naval purposes.
- Naval trawlers are vessels built along the lines of fishing trawlers but fitted out for naval purposes.
- Armed merchantman is a type of merchant ship equipped with naval guns, usually for defensive purposes, either by design or after the fact.
- Commerce raider, any armed vessel—privately or government-owned—sanctioned to raid a nation's merchant fleet.
  - Merchant raiders are disguised commerce raiders.
- Gunboats are naval watercraft designed for the express purpose of carrying one or more guns to bombard coastal targets.
  - River gunboat is a type of gunboat for riverine use.
  - Flat-iron gunboats were a number of classes of coastal gunboats generally characterized by small size, low freeboard, the absence of masts, and the mounting of a single non-traversing large gun, aimed by pointing the vessel.
  - Torpedo gunboat were a form of gunboat armed with torpedoes and designed for hunting and destroying smaller torpedo boats.
  - Motor gunboat is a type of a fast gunboat armed with machine-guns and autocannons.
- Monitor, a type of small, heavily gunned warships with shallow draft designed for shore bombardment.
  - River monitor, a type of monitors used in rivers.
  - Breastwork monitor was a modification of the monitor by Sir Edward Reed of the Royal Navy.
- Q-ship, also known as Q-boats, decoy vessels, special service ships, or mystery ships, were heavily armed merchant ships with concealed weaponry, designed to lure submarines into making surface attacks. This gave Q-ships the chance to open fire and sink them.
- Submarine chaser was a small warship used in anti-submarine warfare.
- Armed yachts were modified yachts that were armed with weapons and were typically in the service of a navy.
- Balloon carrier was a type of ship equipped with a hot-air balloon tied to the ship with a rope or cable, which was used for observation. This type of ship was later replaced by seaplane tenders and aircraft carriers.
- Sloop-of-war was a sailing vessel category later revived in WWII as a convoy escort ship.
  - Screw sloop was a propeller-driven sloop-of-wars used during the mid-19th Century.
- Ironclad, a wooden warship with external iron plating.
  - Casemate ironclad were a type of ironclad gunboats used in the American Civil War.
  - Central battery ship in European continental navies, was a development of the (high-freeboard) broadside ironclad of the 1870s
  - Turret ship was a 19th-century type of warship, the earliest to have their guns mounted in a revolving gun turret, instead of a broadside arrangement.
  - Floating battery is a kind of armed watercraft, often improvised or experimental, which carries heavy armament but has few other qualities as a warship.
- Ship of the line, a sailing warship capable of standing in the line of battle. A direct predecessor to the later battleship.
- Cottonclad warships were steam-powered warships with bales of cotton lining as armour used in the American Civil War. The armaments consisted of a ram, random numbers of different cannons and sharpshooters.
- Brig of War is a brig armed for use by a navy.
- Bomb vessels were wooden sailing ships which carried mortars instead of cannons.
- Dispatch boats were small boats, and sometimes large ships, tasked to carry military dispatches from ship to ship or from ship to shore or, in some cases from shore to shore. Dispatch boats were employed when other means of transmitting a message was not possible or safe or as quick.
  - Aviso, a kind of dispatch boat.
- Man-of-war, a British Navy expression for a sailing warship.
- Grab was a type of ship common on the Malabar Coast in the 18th and 19th centuries. The ghurāb was originally a galley, but the type evolved into sailing ships armed with cannons.
- Gallivat were small, armed type of boats, with sails and oars, armed with swivel guns and used on the Malabar Coast in the 18th and 19th centuries.
- Galleass, a warship equally well suited for sailing and rowing.
- Galleon, a 16th-century armed cargo carriers.
- Galley was a type of ship optimised for propulsion by oars. Galleys were historically used for warfare, trade, and piracy.
- War canoe was a kind of watercraft of the canoe type designed and outfitted for warfare using bow, spear and shield wielding warriors. During the gunpowder era a single brass or iron cannon was mounted on the bow or stern along with musketeers. These warships were used by many tribes and cultures all around the globe.
- Longship, a ship propelled by sails and oars, used by Vikings for raiding.
- East Asian warships:
  - Geobukseon (literally Turtle ship) were wooden sail and oar propelled Korean warships armed with cannons.
  - Panokseon (literally board roofed ship) were a type of Korean wooden warships propelled by both sailing and rowing armed with cannons and Hwacha multiple rocket launchers.
  - Atakebune were wooden oar propelled 16th Century Japanese warships armed with few cannons, arquebusiers, and archers. They were mostly bulky floating fortifications.
  - Mengchong (literally Covered Assaulter) was a type of leather-covered assault warship used in the 2nd and 3rd centuries CE in China.
  - Louchuan (literally Tower Ship) was a type of warship used as a floating fortress in Ancient China. The Louchuan was meant to board troops onto enemy ships. Although they were also armed with trebuchets for ranged combat.
  - Wugongchuan (literally Centipede Ship) was a Chinese oared vessel of the 16th century inspired by the Portuguese galley.
- Hellenistic galleys, warships propelled by oars with a sail for use in favorable winds used in the Mediterranean Sea:
  - Bireme, an ancient vessel, propelled by two banks of oars.
  - Trireme, an ancient warship propelled by three banks of oars.
  - Quadrireme, an ancient warship invented in Carthage with two levels of oarsmen, and was therefore lower than the quinquereme.
  - Quinquereme, an ancient warship propelled by three banks of oars. On the upper row, two rowers hold one oar; on the middle row, two rowers; and on the lower row, one man to an oar.
  - Hexareme, an ancient warship invented in Syracuse. The exact arrangement of the hexareme's oars is unclear. If it evolved naturally from the earlier designs, it would be a trireme with two rowers per oar.
  - Septireme, an ancient warship invented by the Macedonia, the septireme was derived by adding a standing rower to the lower level of the hexareme.
  - Octeres, very little is known about the octeres, at least two of their type were in the fleet of Philip V of Macedon at the Battle of Chios.
  - Enneres, a type of warship whose oaring system may have been a modification of the quadrireme, with two teams of five and four oarsmen.
  - Deceres, a type of warship which is present alongside "nines" in the fleet of Antigonus I Monophthalmus in 315 BC. It is most likely that the "ten" was derived from adding another oarsman to the "nine".
  - Tessarakonteres, a very large catamaran galley reportedly built by Ptolemy IV Philopator of Egypt. It had seven naval rams, with one primary, and the deck would have provided a stable platform for catapults that were often mounted on supergalleys. However, the "forty" was likely just a showpiece; Plutarch describes the ship as for exhibition only.
  - Lembos, light warships most commonly associated with the vessels used by the Illyrian tribes, chiefly for piracy, in the area of Dalmatia. Was soon adopted by Macedonia, Seleucid Empire, Roman Republic and Sparta.
  - Hemiolia, light and fast warship that appeared in the early 4th century BC. It was particularly favoured by pirates in the eastern Mediterranean, but also used by Alexander the Great as far as the rivers Indus and Jhelum, and by the Romans as a troop transport. According to one view, it was manned by half the number of oarsmen to make room for the soldiers. According to another, there were one and a half files of oarsmen on each side, with the additional half file placed amidships, where the hull was wide enough to accommodate them.
  - Trihemiolia, this type was classed with the trireme, and had two and a half files of oarsmen on each side. Judging from the Lindos relief and the famous Nike of Samothrace, both of which are thought to represent trihemioliai, the two upper files would have been accommodated in an oarbox, with the half-file located beneath them in the classic thalamitai position of the trireme.
  - Liburna, a type of small galley used for raiding and patrols. It was originally used by the Liburnians, a pirate tribe from Dalmatia, and later used by the Roman Navy. It had one bench with 25 oars on each side, while in the late Roman Republic, it was equipped with two banks of oars (a bireme), remaining faster, lighter, and more agile than triremes.
- Maritime Southeast Asian warships:
  - Djong were sailing warships armed with up to a hundred cannons.
  - Kakap were small warships used in Maritime Southeast Asia.
  - Kelulus were Nusantaran warships used as troop transports and raiding vessels.
  - Lancaran were a type of galley warships armed with cetbang cannons.
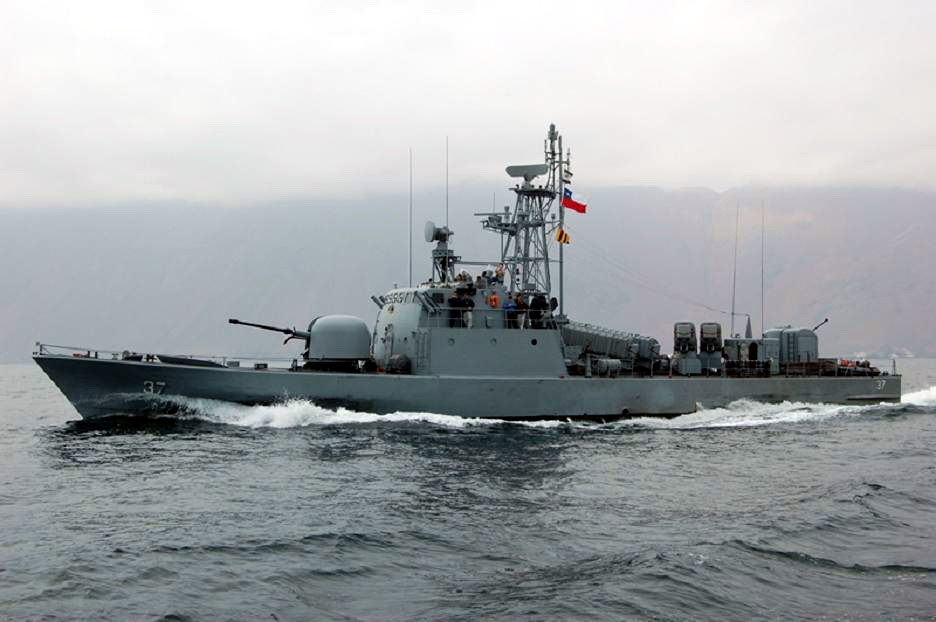
A fast attack craft of the Chilean Navy

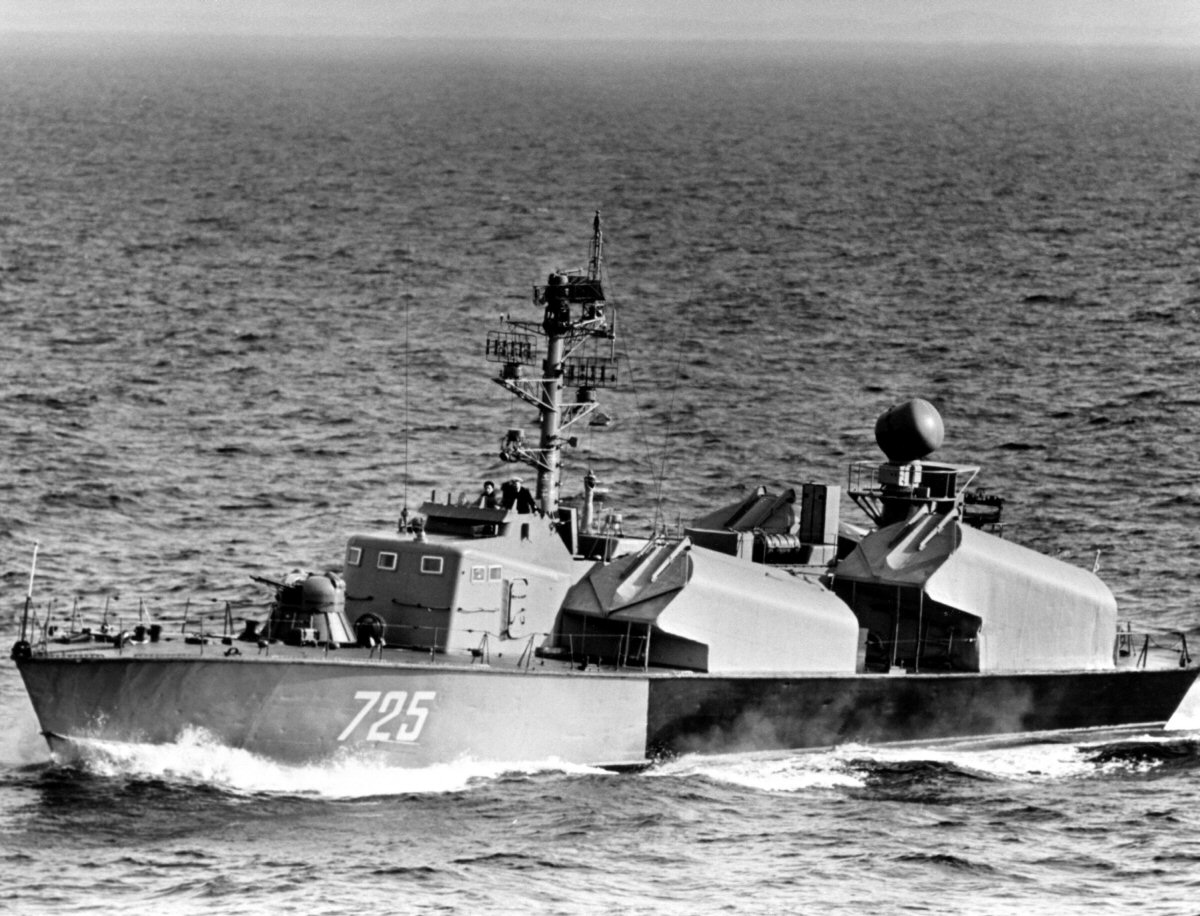
An Osa I class missile boat in 1983.

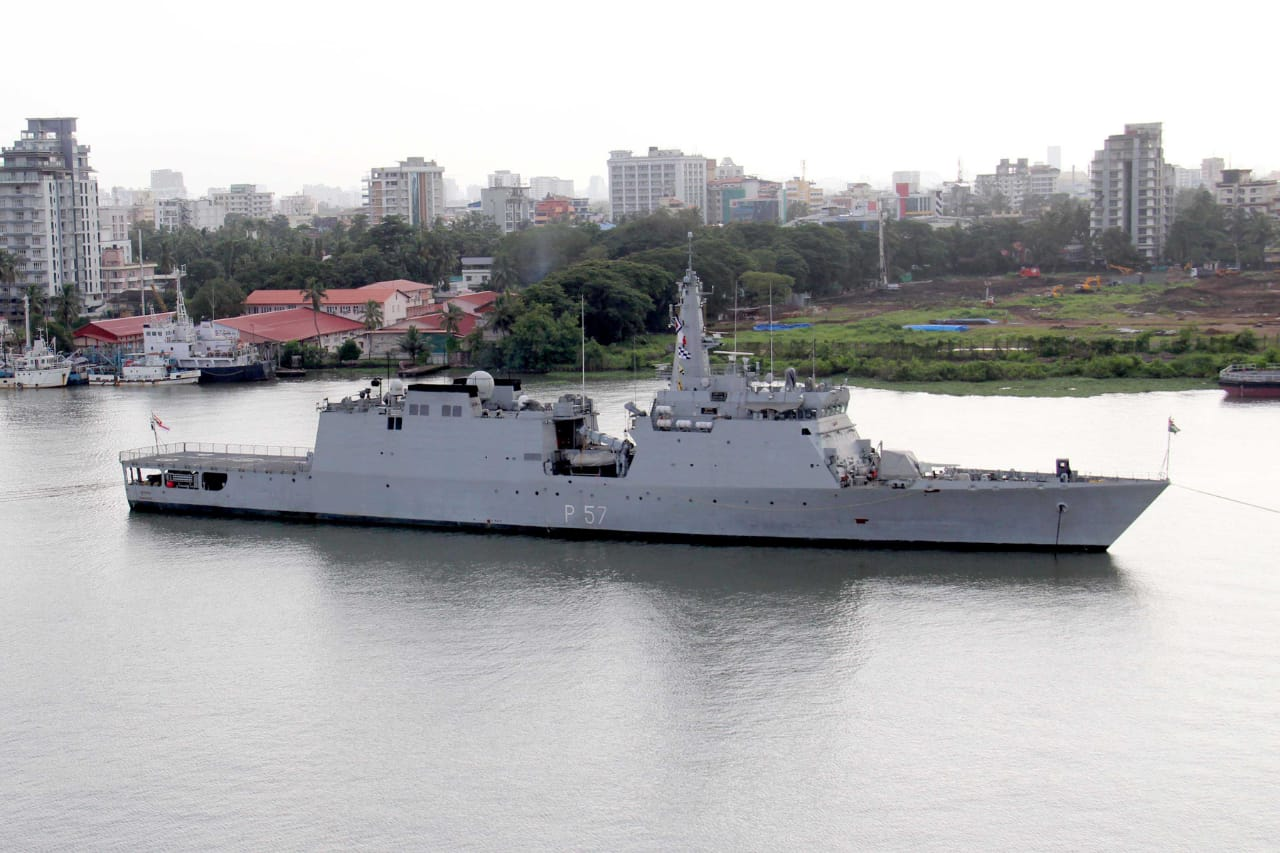
INS Sunayna, an Indian Offshore Patrol Vessel

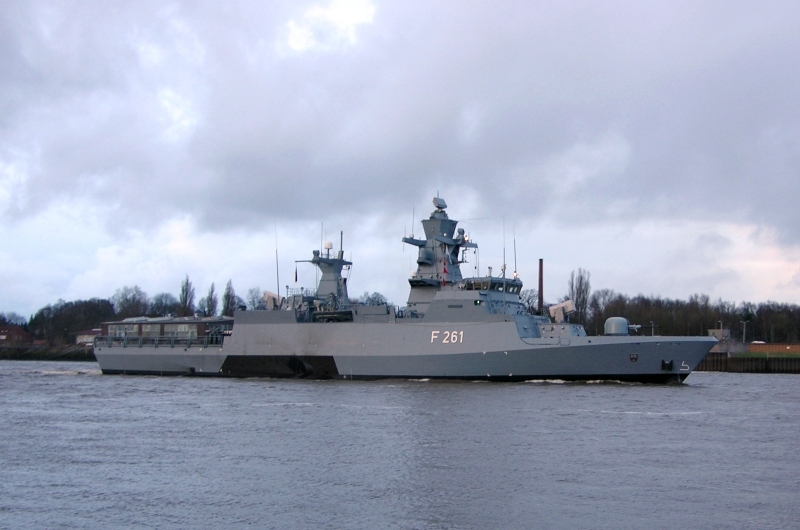
Magdeburg, a German Braunschweig-class corvette (2008)

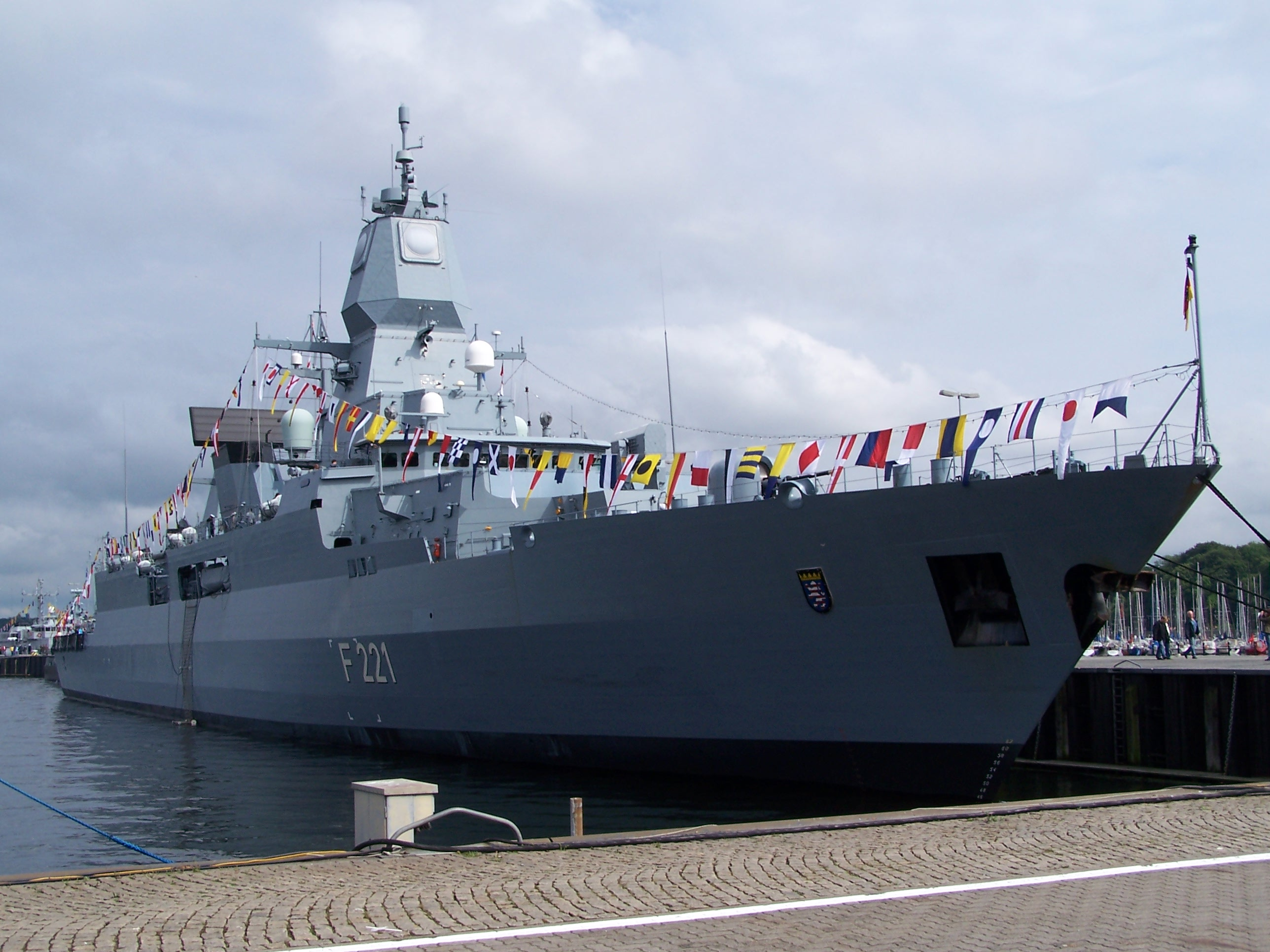
A German Sachsen-class frigate (2006)

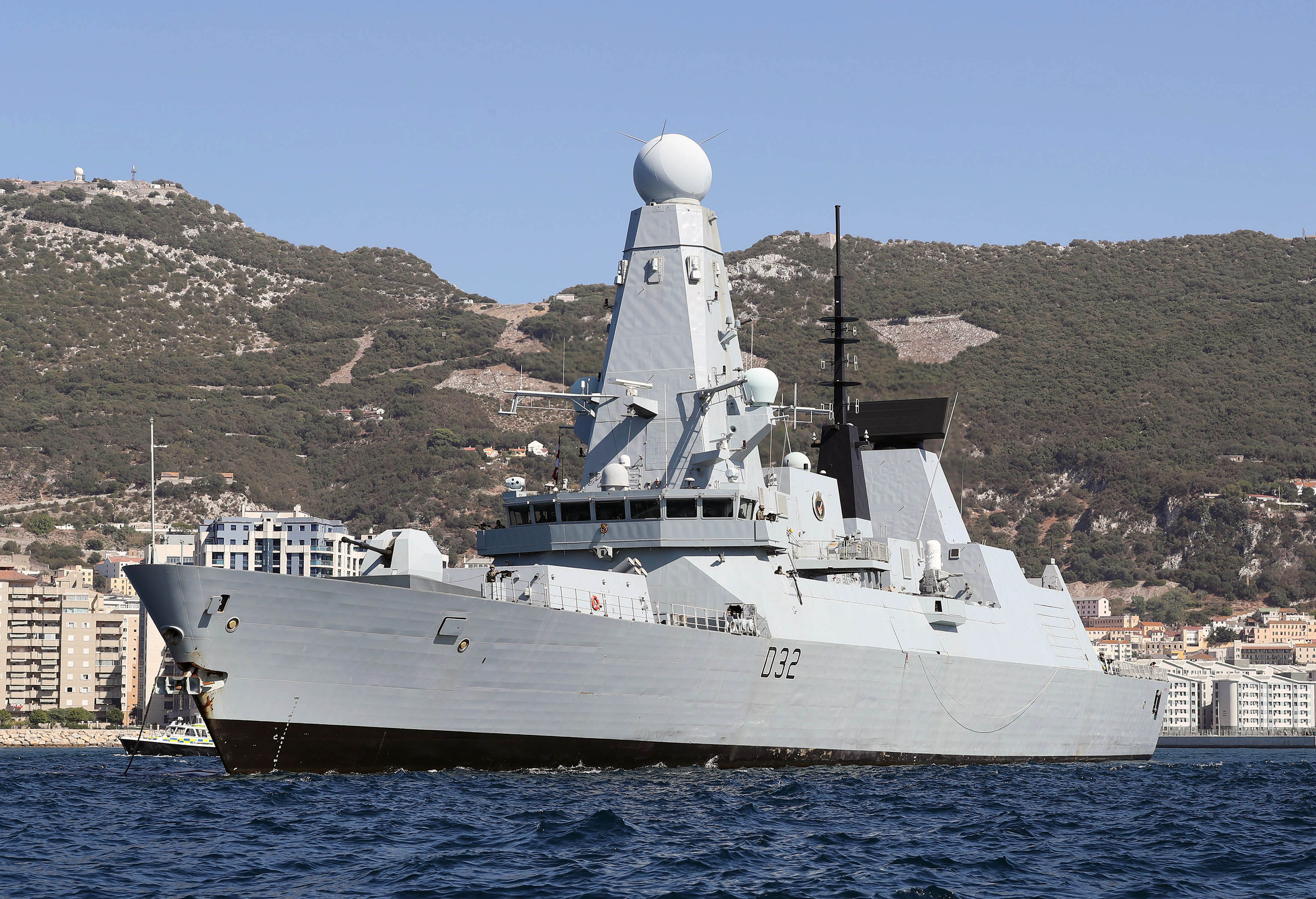
British destroyer HMS Daring visiting Gibraltar in 2016

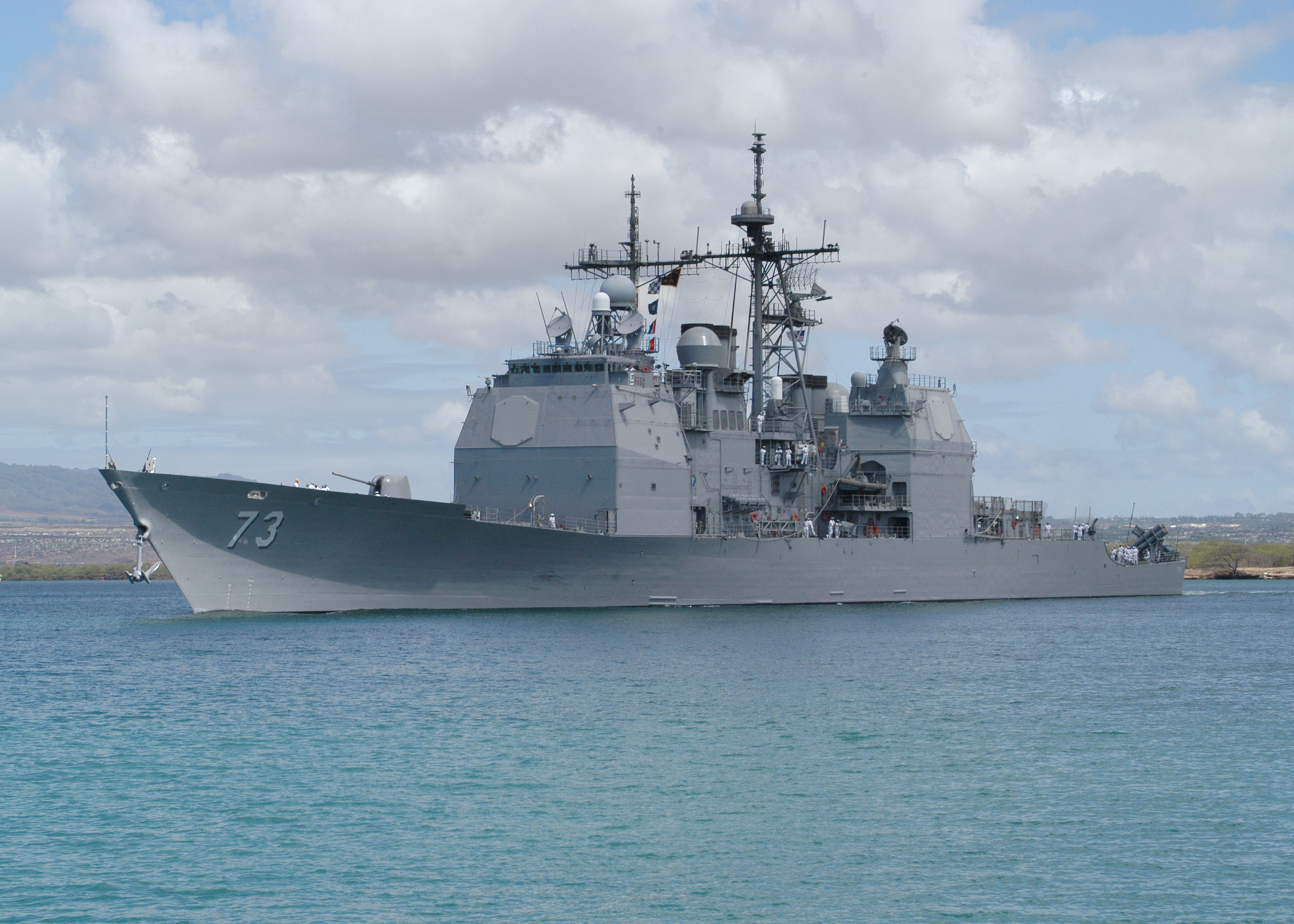
American cruiser USS Port Royal in September 2003

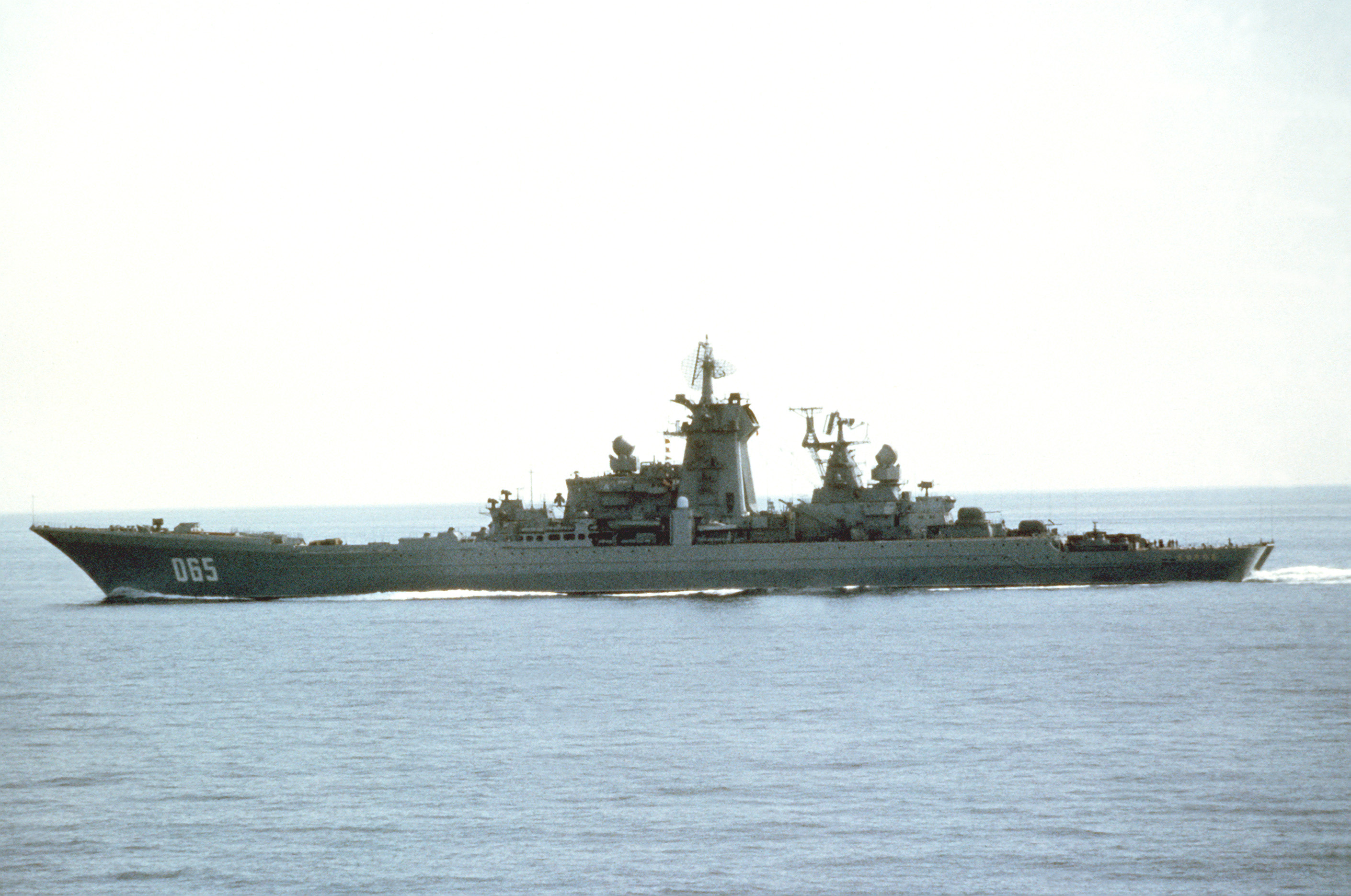
Soviet battlecruiser Kirov, 1983

== History and evolution of warships ==
=== First warships ===
The first evidence of ships being used for warfare comes from Ancient Egypt, specifically the northern Nile River most likely to defend against Mediterranean peoples. The galley warship most likely originated in Crete, an idea which was soon copied and popularized by the Phoenicians. In the time of Mesopotamia, Ancient Persia, Phoenicia, Ancient Greece and the Ancient Rome, warships were always galleys (such as biremes, triremes and quinqueremes): long, narrow vessels powered by banks of oarsmen and designed to ram and sink enemy vessels, or to engage them bow-first and follow up with boarding parties. The development of catapults in the 4th century BC and the subsequent refinement of this technology enabled the first fleets of siege engine - equipped warships by the Hellenistic age. During late antiquity, ramming fell out of use and the galley tactics against other ships used during the Middle Ages until the late 16th century focused on boarding.

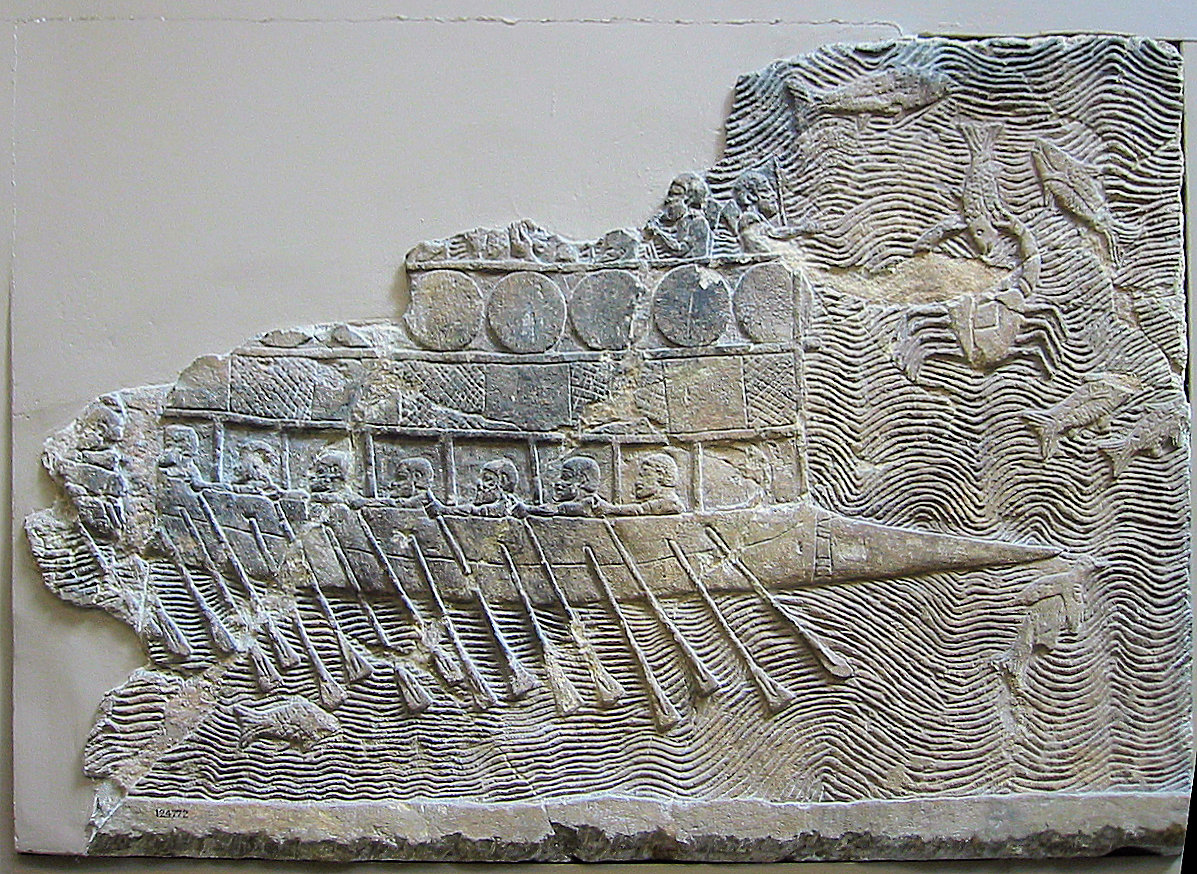
Assyrian warship, a bireme with pointed bow circa 700 BC

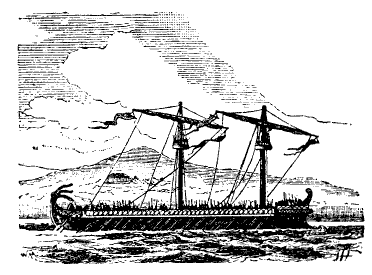
Trireme, a warship used by the Romans and Greeks in ancient times

=== The Age of Sail ===
Naval artillery was redeveloped in the 14th century, but cannon did not become common at sea until the guns were capable of being reloaded quickly enough to be reused in the same battle. The size of a ship required to carry a large number of cannons made oar-based propulsion unfeasible, and warships came to rely primarily on sails. The sailing man-of-war emerged during the 16th century.

By the middle of the 17th century, warships were carrying increasing numbers of cannons on their broadsides and tactics evolved to bring each ship's firepower to bear in a line of battle. The man-of-war now evolved into the ship of the line. In the 18th century, the frigate and sloop-of-war – too small to stand in the line of battle – evolved to escort convoy trade, scout for enemy ships and blockade enemy coasts. Also during this time, the ship's wheel came more into common usage instead of the whipstaff for steering the ship.

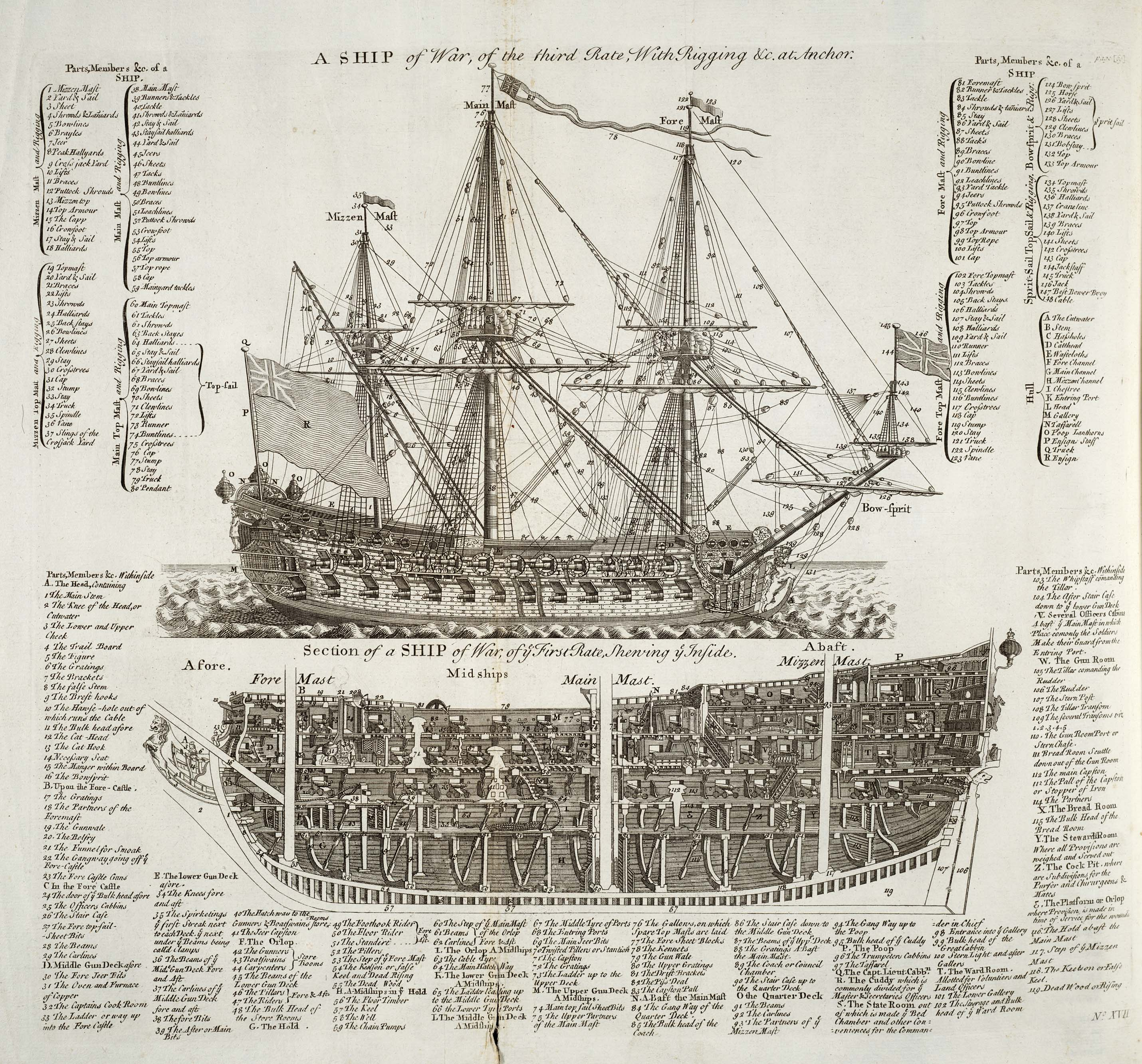
Diagrams of first and third rate warships, England, 1728

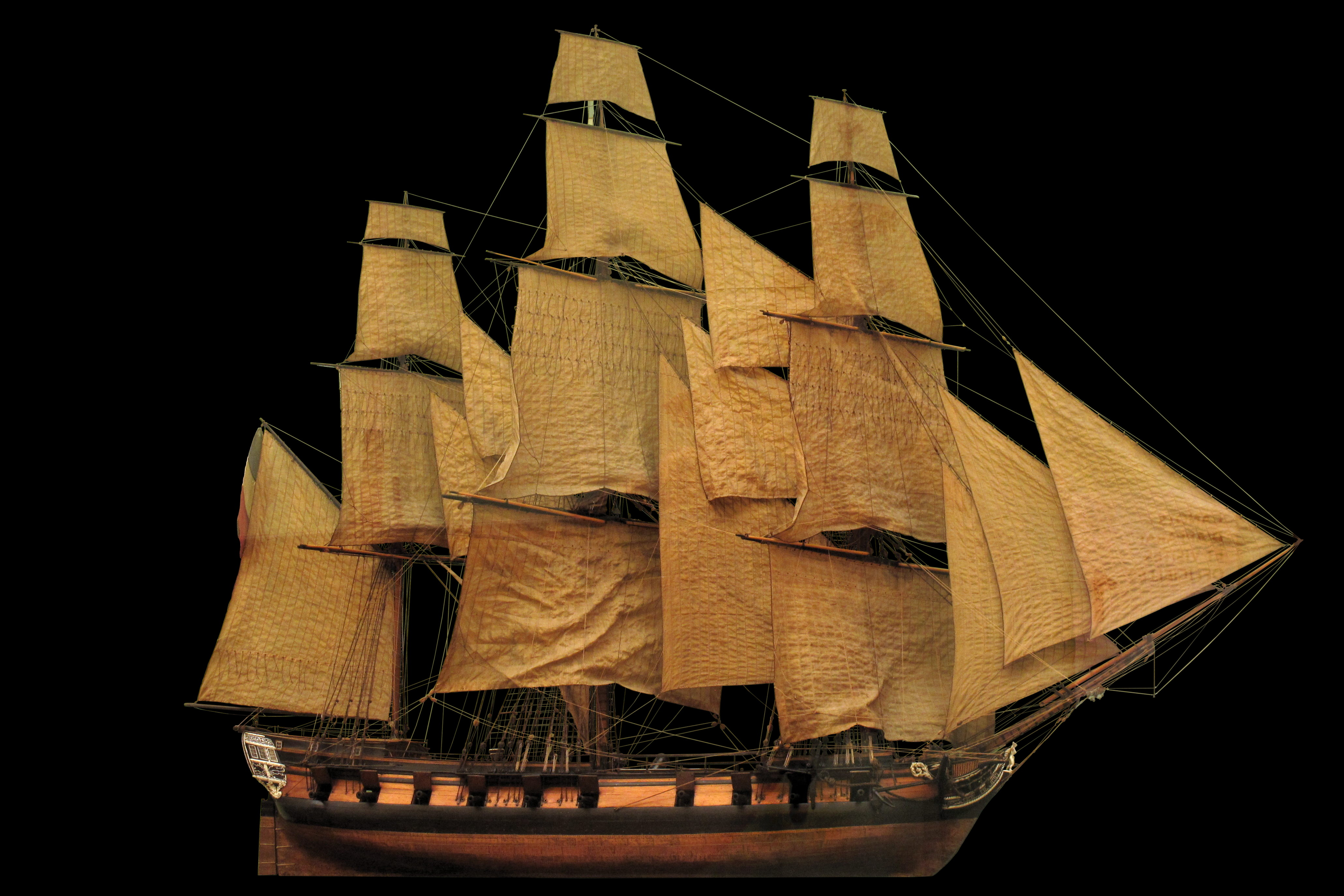
A sailing corvette scale model in the Trianon model collection

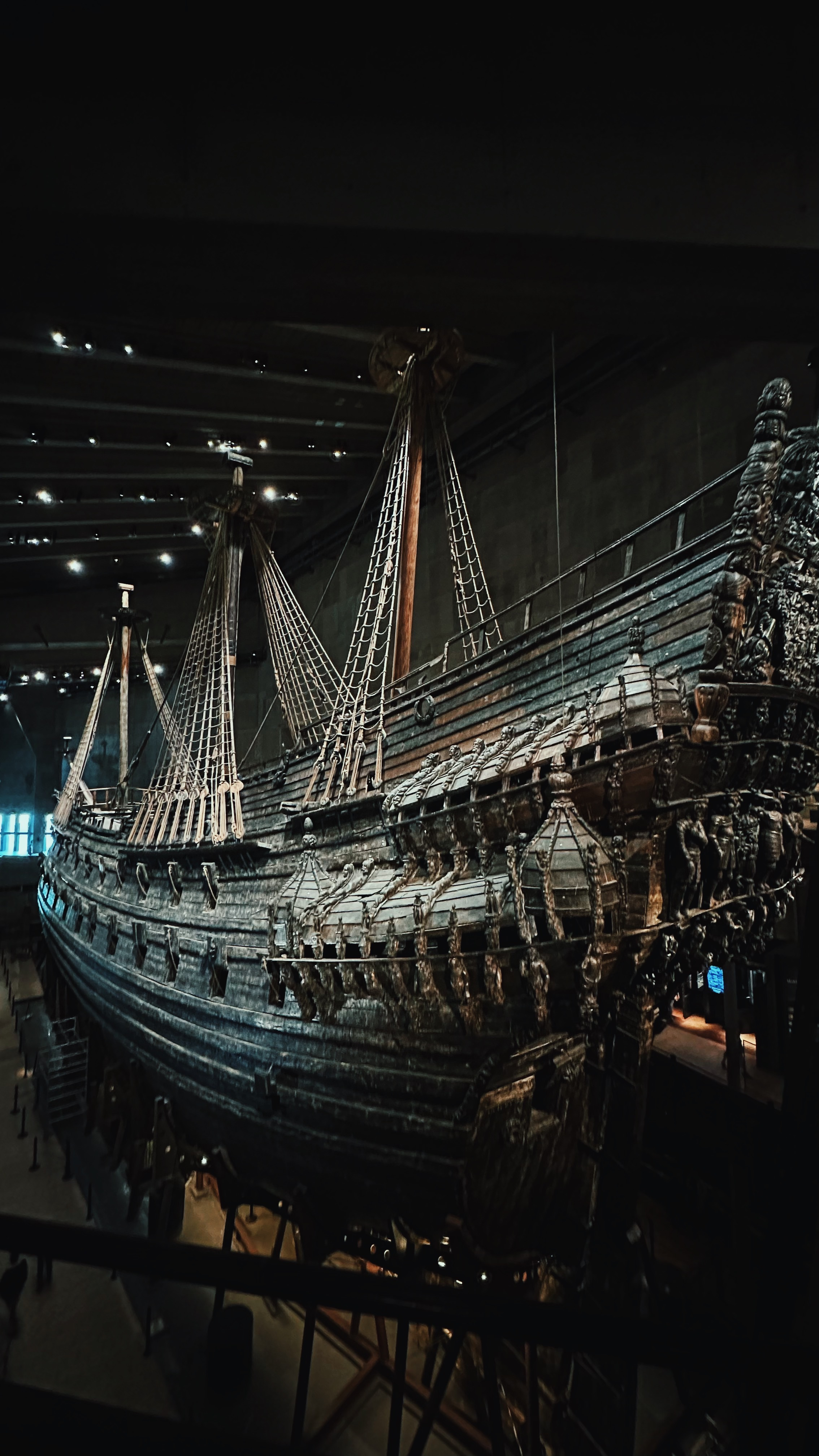
The Swedish warship Vasa

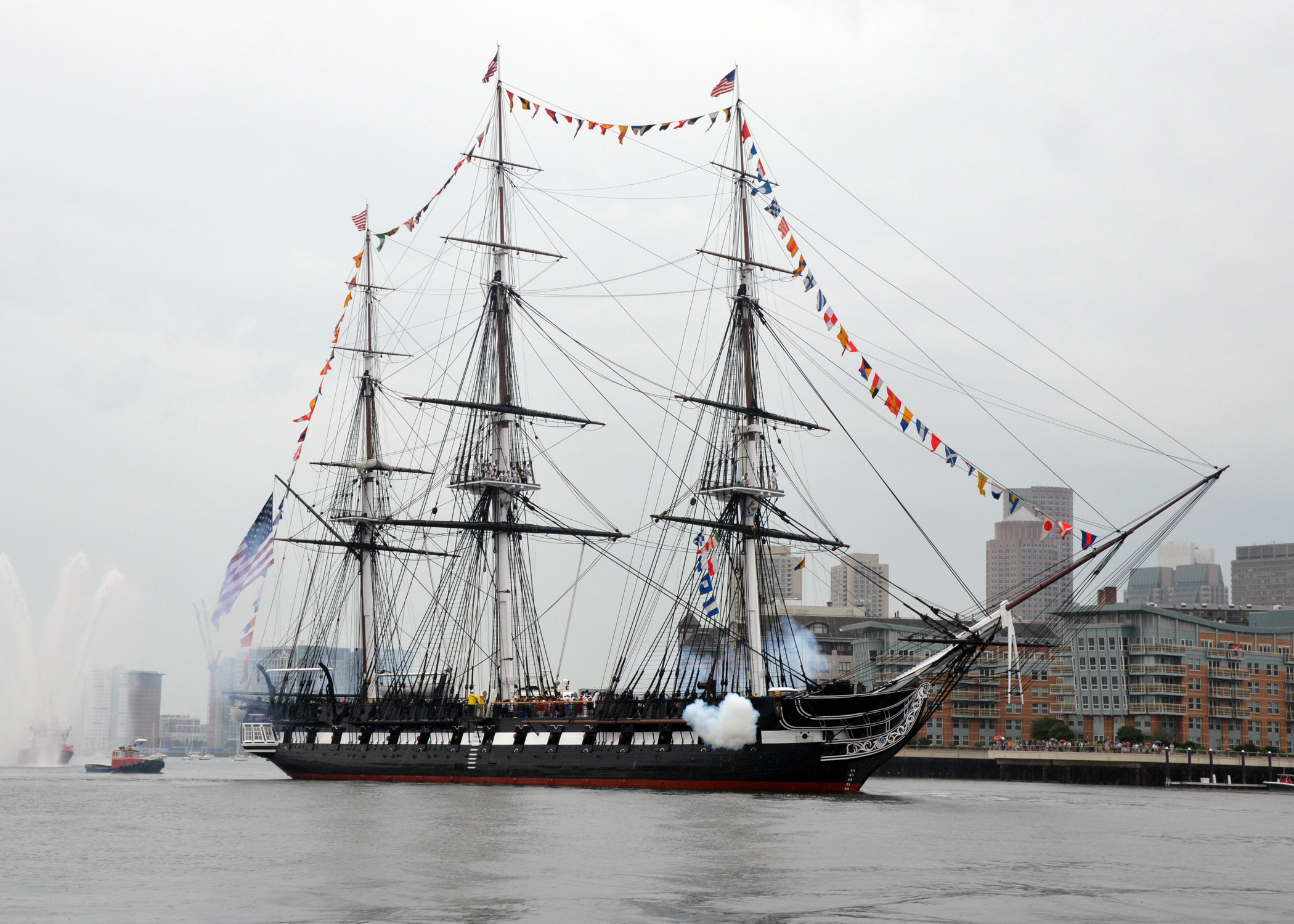
American sailing frigate USS Constitution

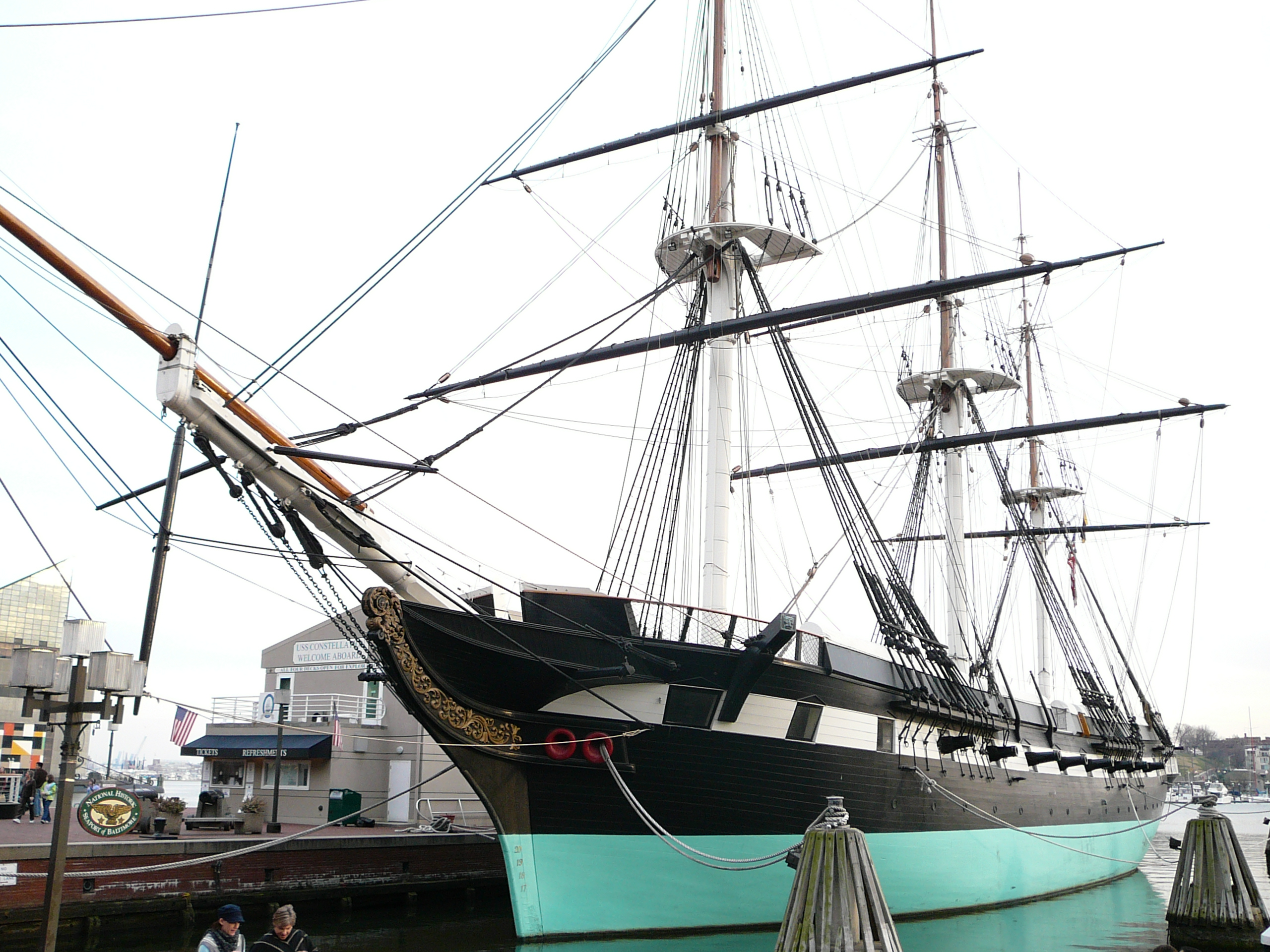
American sloop-of-war USS Constellation in 2012

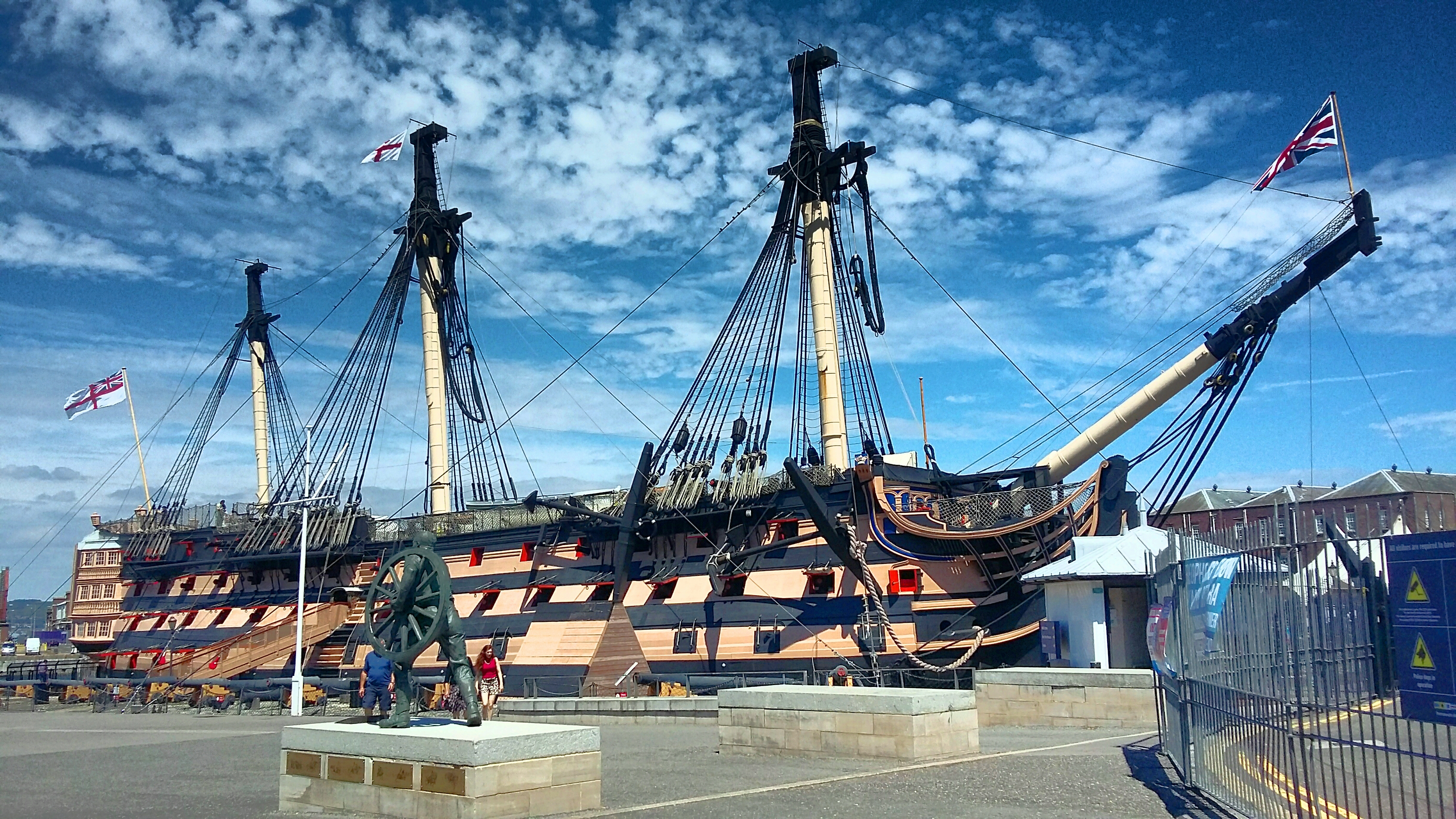
Starboard side of the British ship of the line HMS Victory

=== Steel, steam and shellfire ===
During the 19th century a revolution took place in the means of marine propulsion, naval armament and construction of warships. Marine steam engines were introduced, at first as an auxiliary force, in the second quarter of the 19th century. The Crimean War gave a great stimulus to the development of guns. The introduction of explosive shells soon led to the introduction of iron, and later steel, naval armour for the sides and decks of larger warships. The first ironclad warships, the French Gloire and British Warrior, made wooden vessels obsolete. Metal soon entirely replaced wood as the main material for warship construction.

From the 1850s, the sailing ships of the line were replaced by steam-powered battleships, while the sailing frigates were replaced by steam-powered cruisers. The armament of warships also changed with the invention of the rotating barbettes and turrets, which allowed the guns to be aimed independently of the direction of the ship and allowed a smaller number of larger guns to be carried.

The final innovation during the 19th century was the development of the torpedo and development of the torpedo boat. Small, fast torpedo boats seemed to offer an alternative to building expensive fleets of battleships.

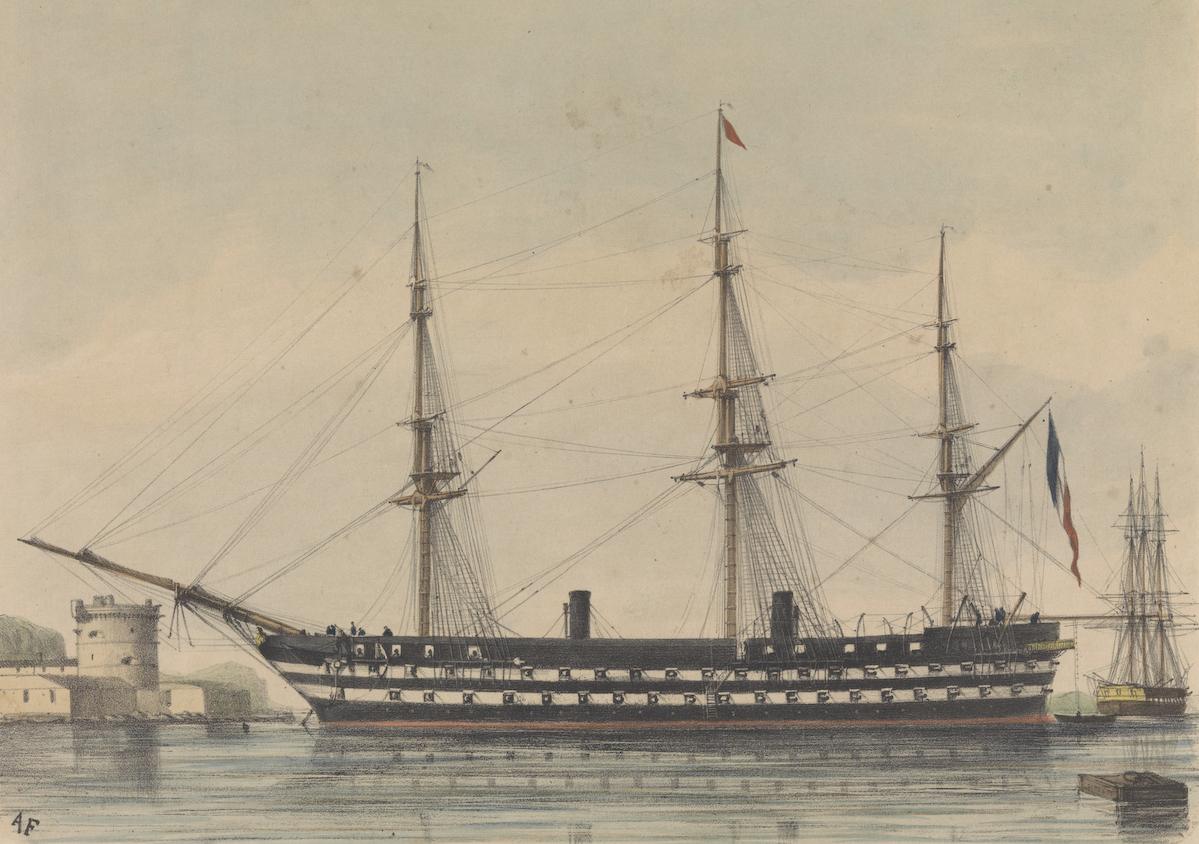
French ship-of-the-line Napoléon, the first steam powered battleship.

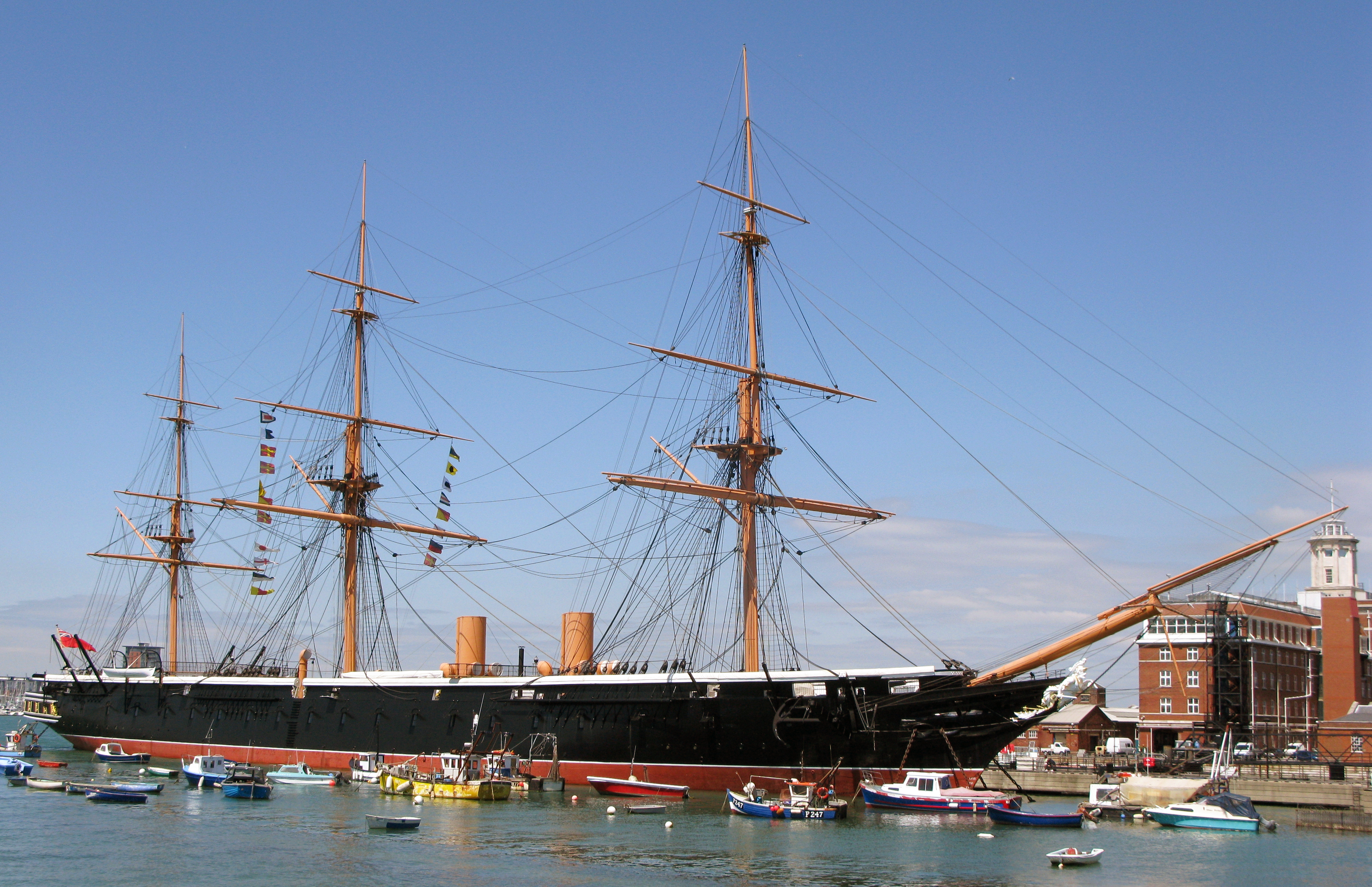
HMS Warrior, first ironclad battleship of the Royal Navy

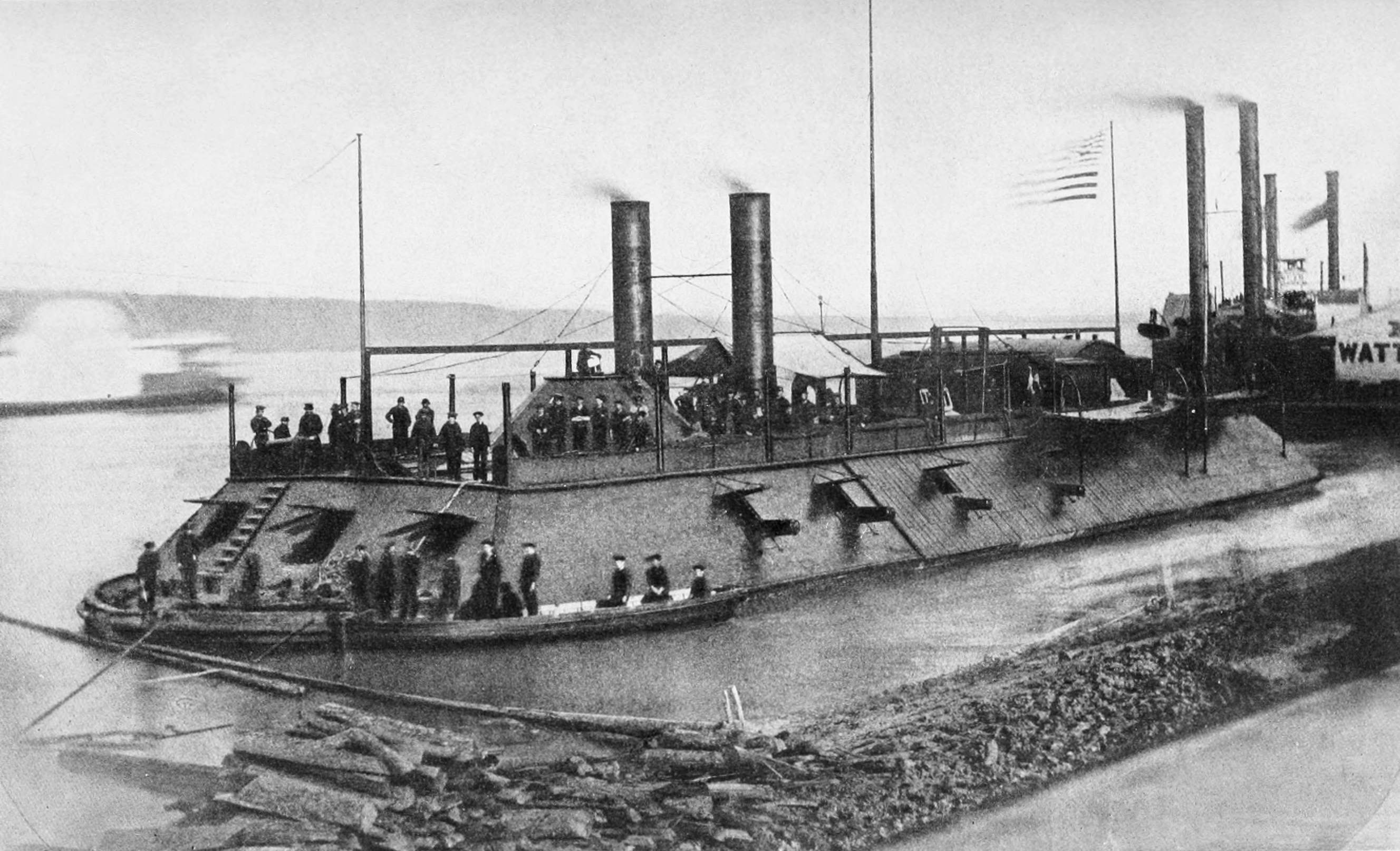
Casemate ironclad USS Cairo on a contemporary photograph.

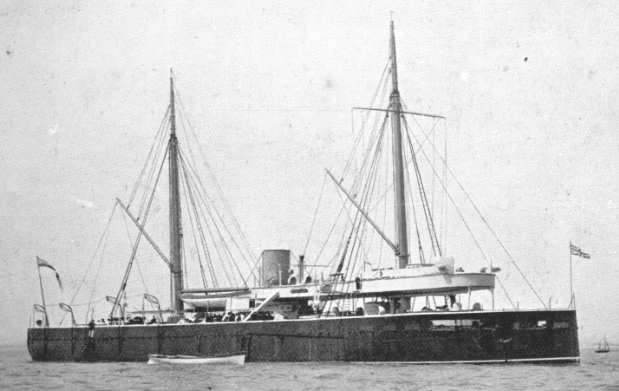
HMS Prince Albert, a pioneering turret ship, built by naval engineer Cowper Phipps Coles.

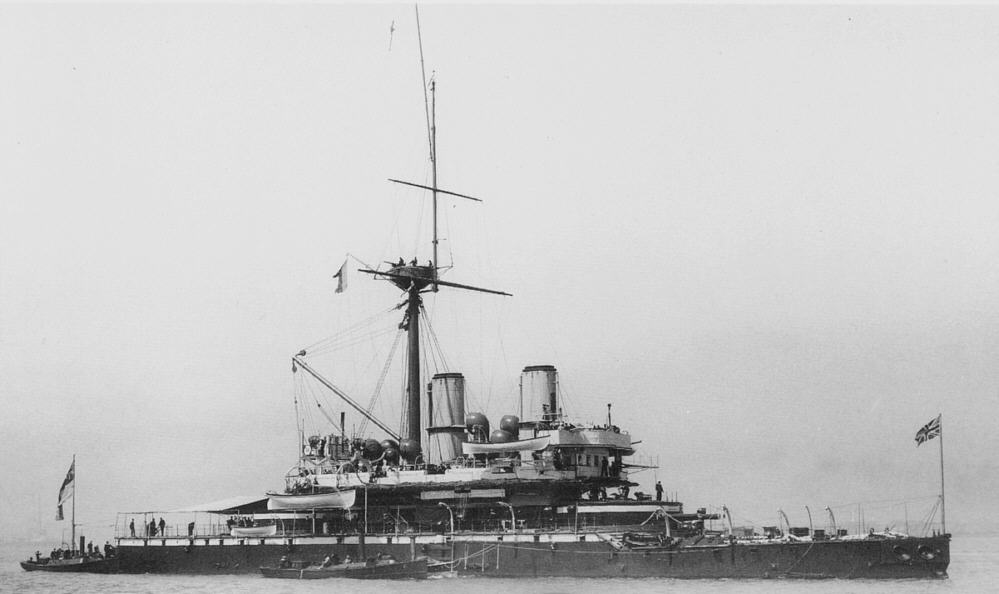
HMS Devastation was the first sea-going ironclad to not use sails and completely rely on its steam engines.

=== Pre-dreadnought era ===
Pre-dreadnought battleships were sea-going battleships built between the mid- to late 1880s and 1905, before the launch of HMS Dreadnought in 1906. The pre-dreadnought ships replaced the ironclad battleships of the 1870s and 1880s. Built from steel, protected by case-hardened steel armour, and powered by coal-fired triple-expansion steam engines, pre-dreadnought battleships carried a main battery of very heavy guns in fully enclosed rotating turrets supported by one or more secondary batteries of lighter weapons. The role of corvettes, sloops and frigates were taken by new types of ships like destroyers, protected cruisers and armoured cruisers.

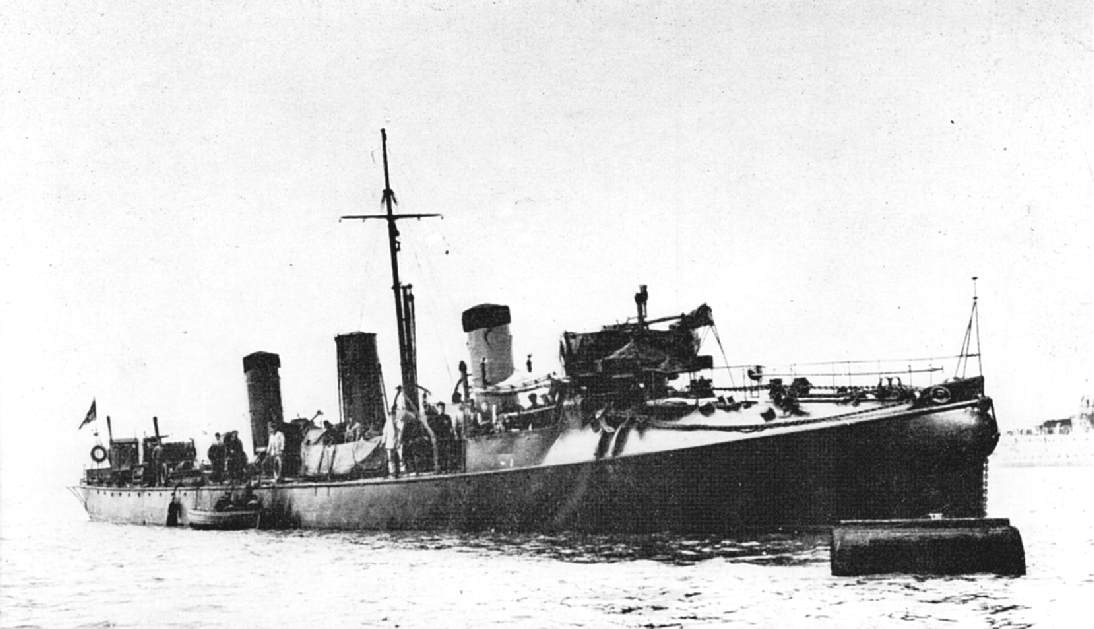
HMS Havock, the first true destroyer.

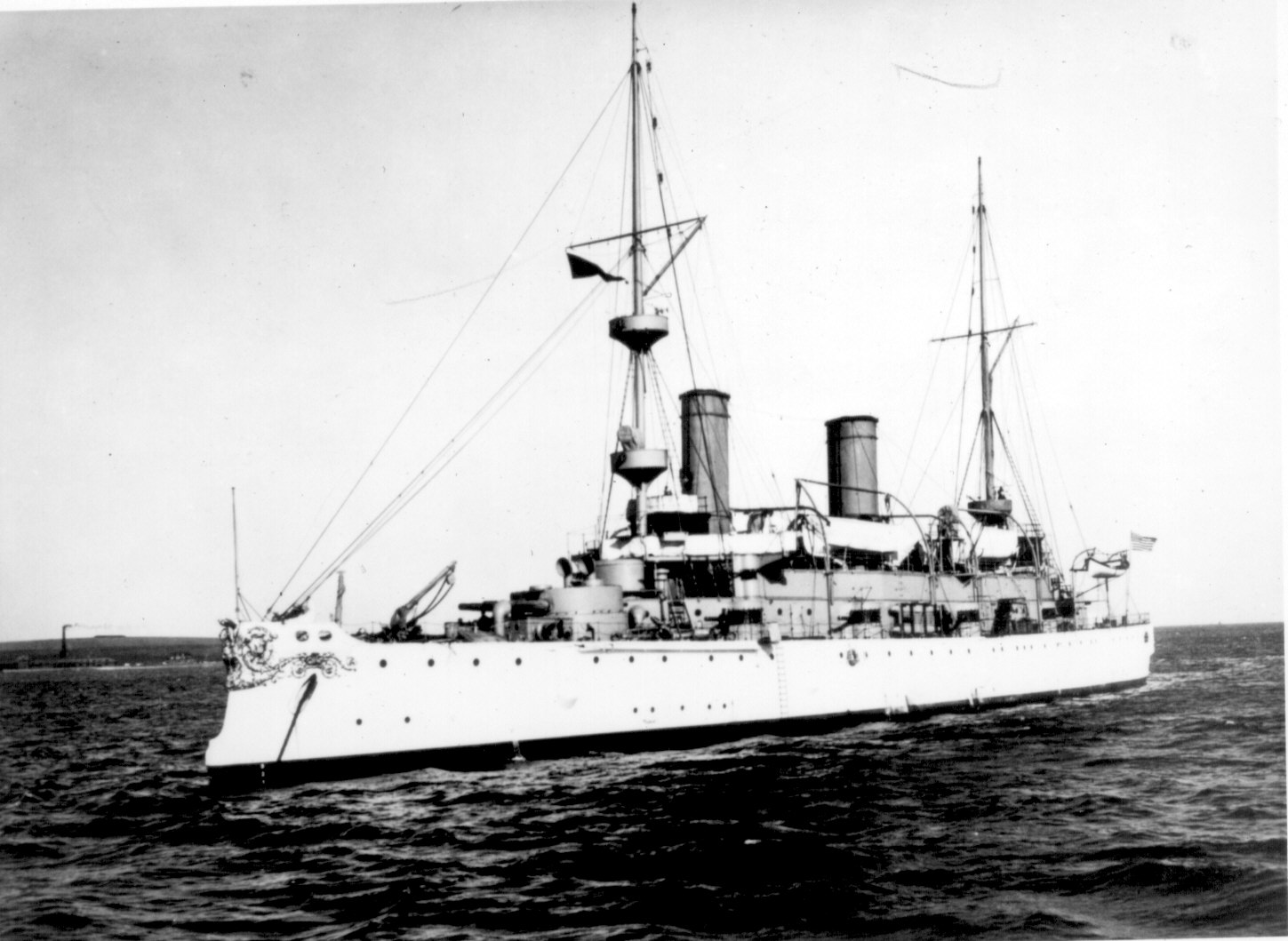
USS Olympia, a protected cruiser.

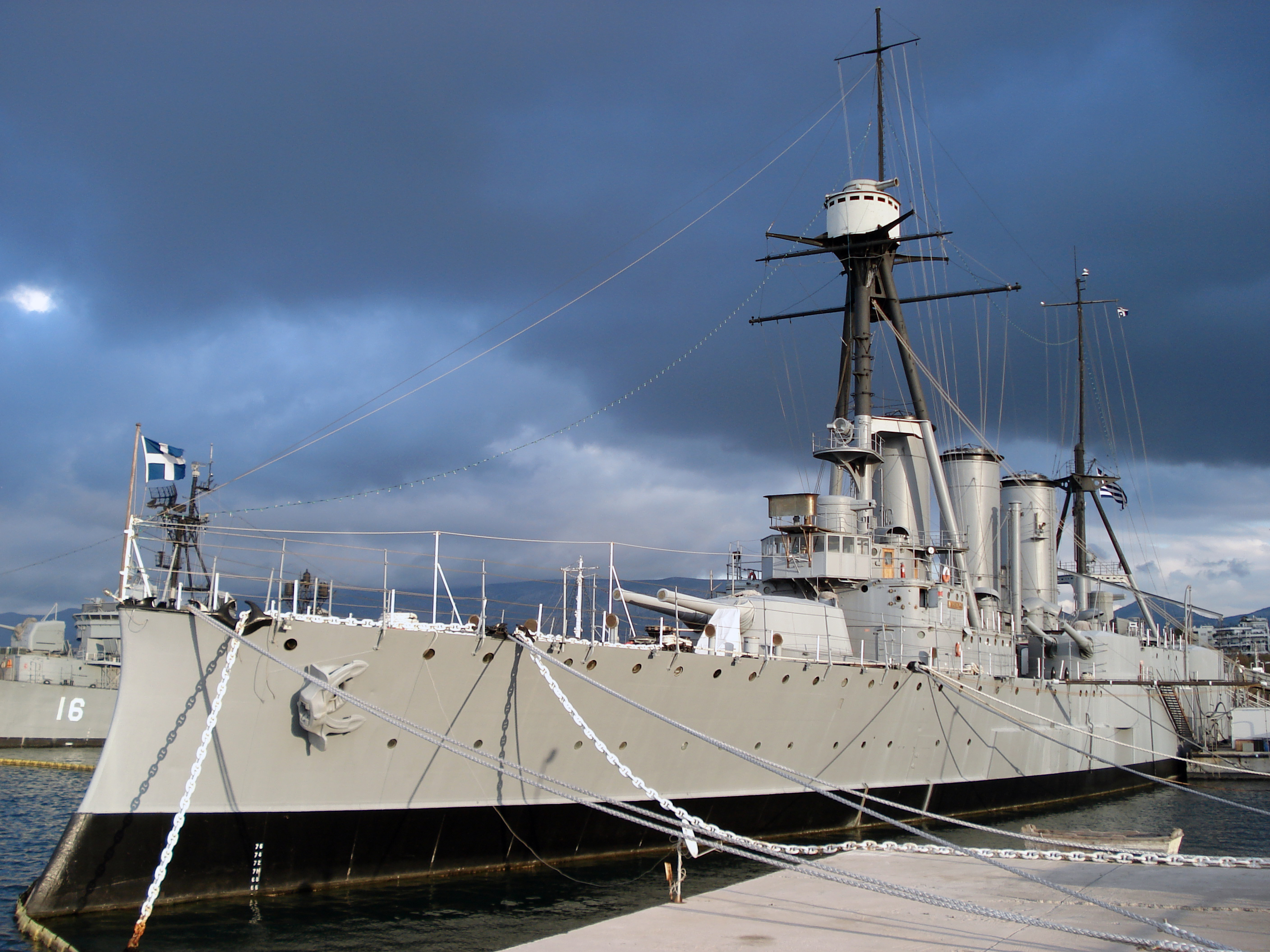
Greek cruiser Georgios Averof, only surviving example of an armoured cruiser.

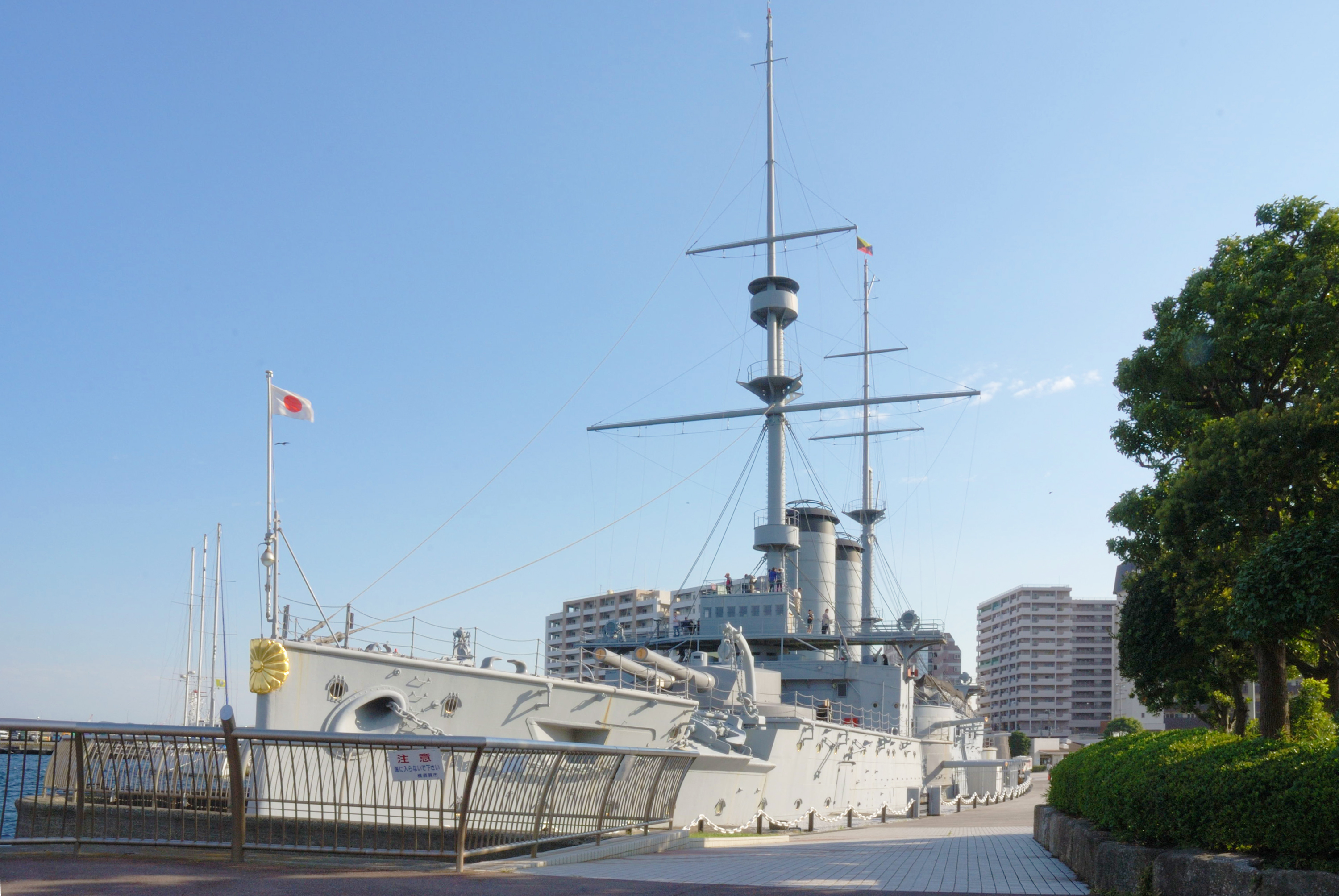
Japanese battleship Mikasa, only surviving example of a pre-dreadnought battleship.

=== 1906 onward ===
==== The dreadnought era ====
Another revolution in capital warship design began shortly after the start of the 20th century, when Britain launched the Royal Navy's all-big-gun battleship Dreadnought in 1906. Powered by steam turbines, it was bigger, faster and more heavily gunned than any existing battleships, which it immediately rendered obsolete. It was rapidly followed by similar ships in other countries. The Royal Navy also developed the first battlecruisers. Mounting the same heavy guns as the dreadnoughts on an even larger hull, battlecruisers sacrificed armour protection for speed. Battlecruisers were faster and more powerful than all existing cruisers, but much more vulnerable to shellfire than contemporary battleships. The torpedo-boat destroyer was developed at the same time as the dreadnoughts. Bigger, faster and more heavily gunned than the torpedo boat, the destroyer evolved to protect the capital ships from the menace of the torpedo boat.

At this time, Britain also introduced the use of fuel oil to power steam warships, instead of coal. Oil produced twice as much power per unit weight as coal, and was much easier to handle. Tests were conducted by the Royal Navy in 1904 involving the torpedo-boat destroyer Spiteful, the first warship powered solely by fuel oil. These proved its superiority, and all warships procured for the Royal Navy from 1912 were designed to burn fuel oil.

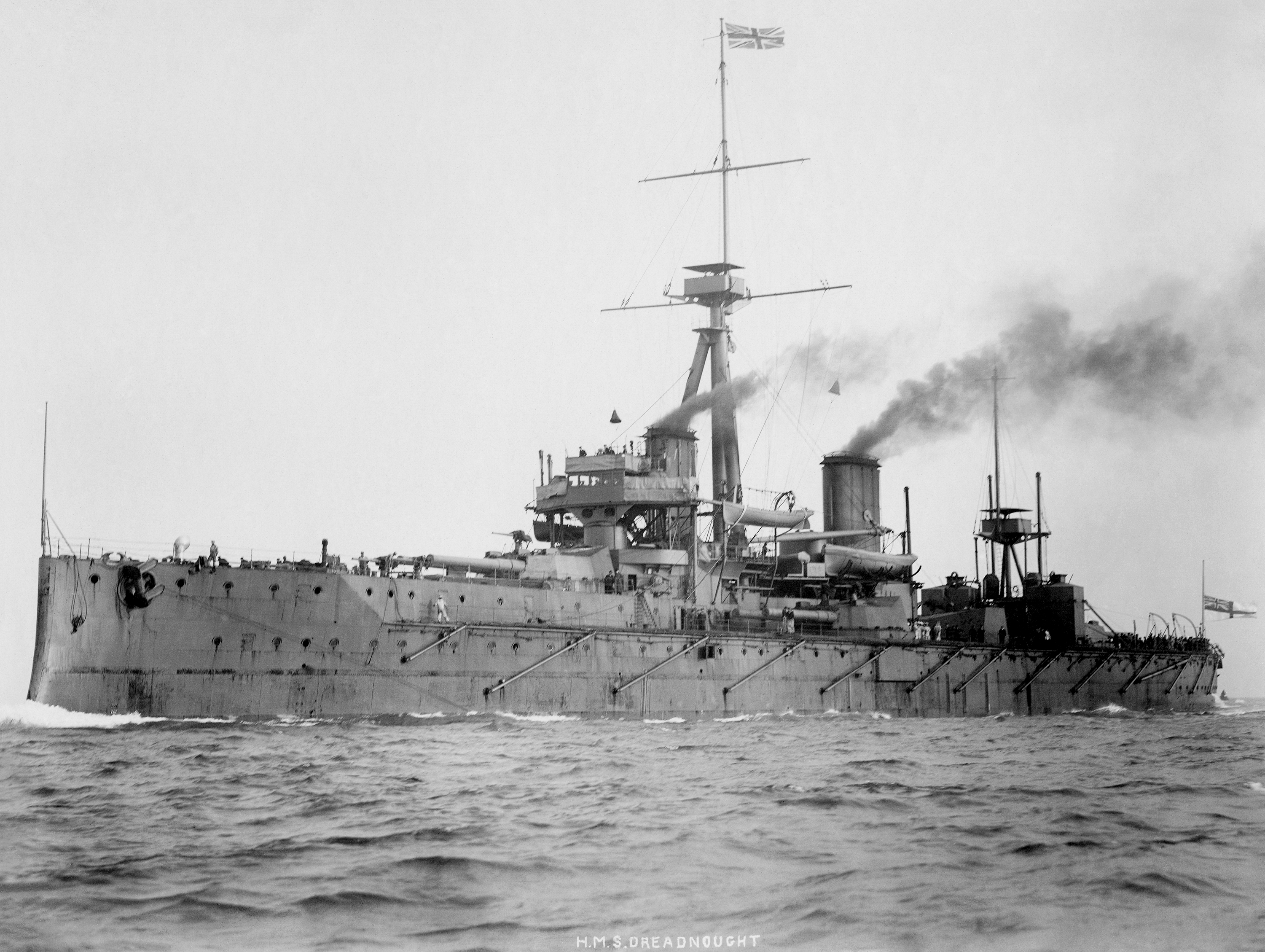
The all-big-gun steam-turbine-driven dreadnought battleship HMS Dreadnought

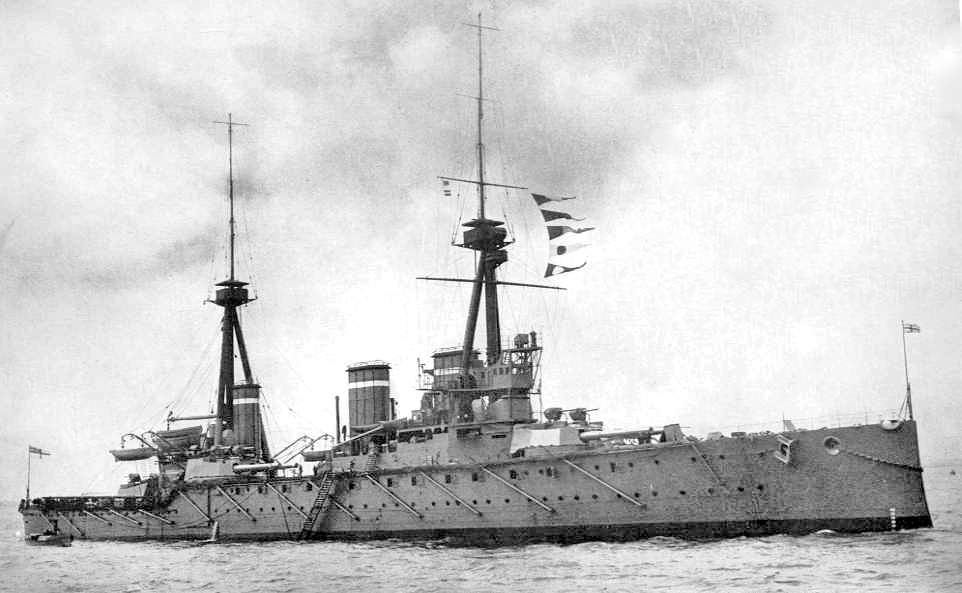
HMS Invincible, the first battlecruiser

By this time, the term flagship, that is, a ship carrying the flag of a commanding admiral or commodore, had been in use for centuries. Royal Navy ships with the opposite status, commissioned warships in active service that were not currently serving as the flagship of a flag officer were increasingly described as "private" ships, akin to private soldiers. (Note: A straightforward definition of the term "private ship" used in the sense is difficult to find in common naval history literature, but see individual ships' operational histories in R. A. Burt's British Battleships 1889–1904, among other books, for numerous uses of the term in the manner described here.)

==== Obsolescence of battleships ====
During the lead-up to the Second World War, Germany and the United Kingdom once again emerged as the two dominant Atlantic sea powers. The German navy, under the Treaty of Versailles, was limited to only a few minor surface ships. But the clever use of deceptive terminology, such as Panzerschiffe deceived the British and French commands. They were surprised when ships such as Admiral Graf Spee, Scharnhorst, and Gneisenau raided Allied supply lines. The greatest threat however, was the introduction of the Kriegsmarine's largest vessels, Bismarck and Tirpitz. Bismarck was heavily damaged and sunk/scuttled after a series of sea battles in the north Atlantic in 1941, while Tirpitz was destroyed by the Royal Air Force in 1944. The British Royal Navy gained dominance of the European theatre by 1943.

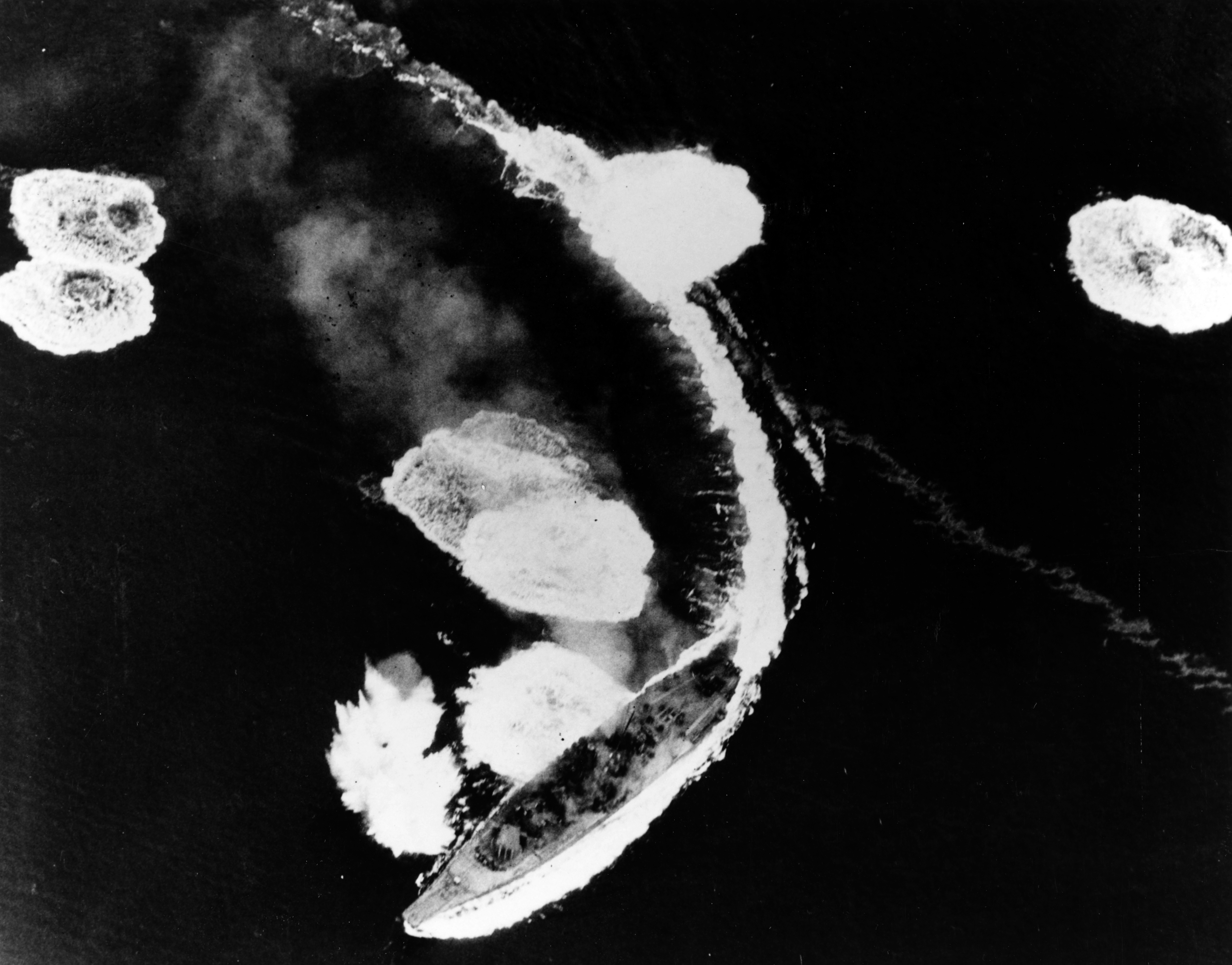
Japanese battleship Yamato under air attack off Kure on 19 March 1945

The Second World War brought massive changes in the design and role of several types of warships. For the first time, the aircraft carrier became the clear choice to serve as the main capital ship within a naval task force. World War II was the only war in history in which battles occurred between groups of carriers. World War II saw the first use of radar in combat. It brought the first naval battle in which the ships of both sides never engaged in direct combat, instead sending aircraft to make the attacks, as in the Battle of the Coral Sea.

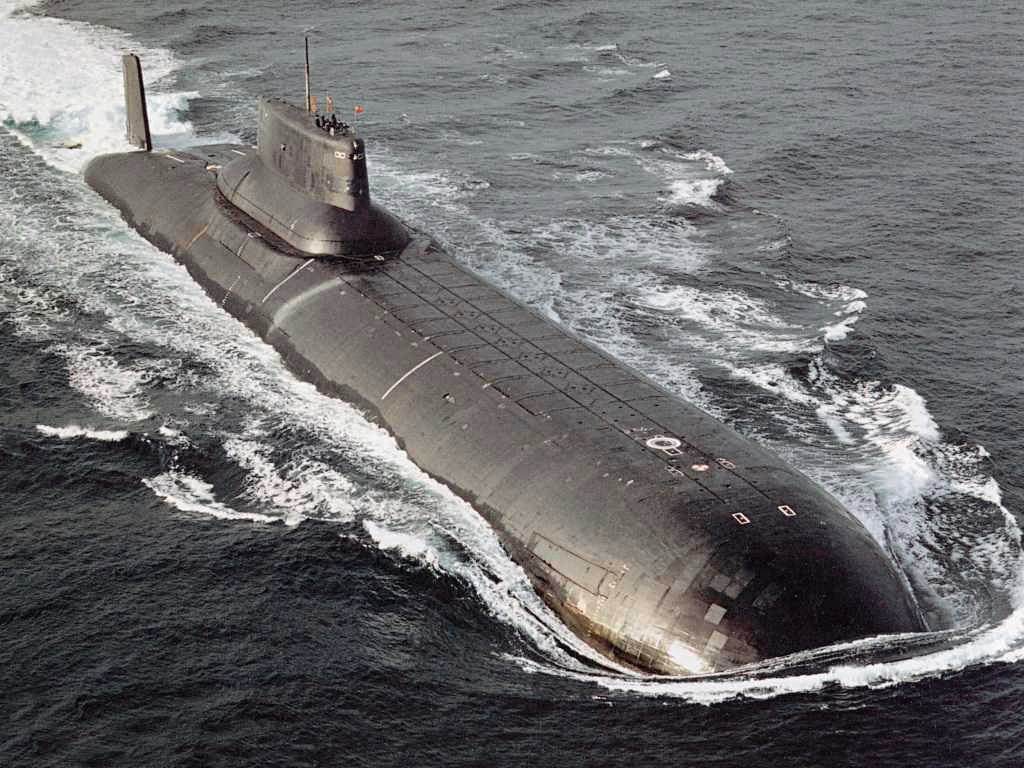
Russian Typhoon-class submarine

==== Cold War-era ====
Modern warships are generally divided into seven main categories, which are: aircraft carriers, cruisers, destroyers, frigates, corvettes, submarines, and amphibious warfare ships.

Battleships comprise an eighth category, but are not in current service with any navy in the world. Only the deactivated American Iowa-class battleships still exist as potential combatants, and battleships in general are unlikely to re-emerge as a ship class without redefinition. The Kirov-class battlecruiser is a guided missile cruiser that straddles the line between a heavy cruiser and a battleship. They are often called battlecruisers by Western defence commentators.

The destroyer is generally regarded as the dominant surface-combat vessel of most modern blue-water navies. However, the once distinct roles and appearances of cruisers, destroyers, frigates, and corvettes have blurred. Most vessels have come to be armed with a mix of anti-surface, anti-submarine and anti-aircraft weapons. Class designations no longer reliably indicate a displacement hierarchy, and the size of all vessel types has grown beyond the definitions used earlier in the 20th century. Another key difference between older and modern vessels is that all modern warships are "soft", without the thick armor and bulging anti-torpedo protection of World War II and older designs.

Most navies also include many types of support and auxiliary vessels, such as minesweepers, patrol boats and offshore patrol vessels.

By 1982 the United Nations Convention on the Law of the Sea (UNCLOS) treaty negotiations had produced a legal definition of what was then generally accepted as a late-twentieth century warship. The UNCLOS definition was : "A warship means a ship belonging to the armed forces of a State bearing the external marks distinguishing such ships of its nationality, under the command of an officer duly commissioned by the government of the State and whose name appears in the appropriate service list or its equivalent, and manned by a crew which is under regular armed forces discipline."

===== Development of the submarine =====
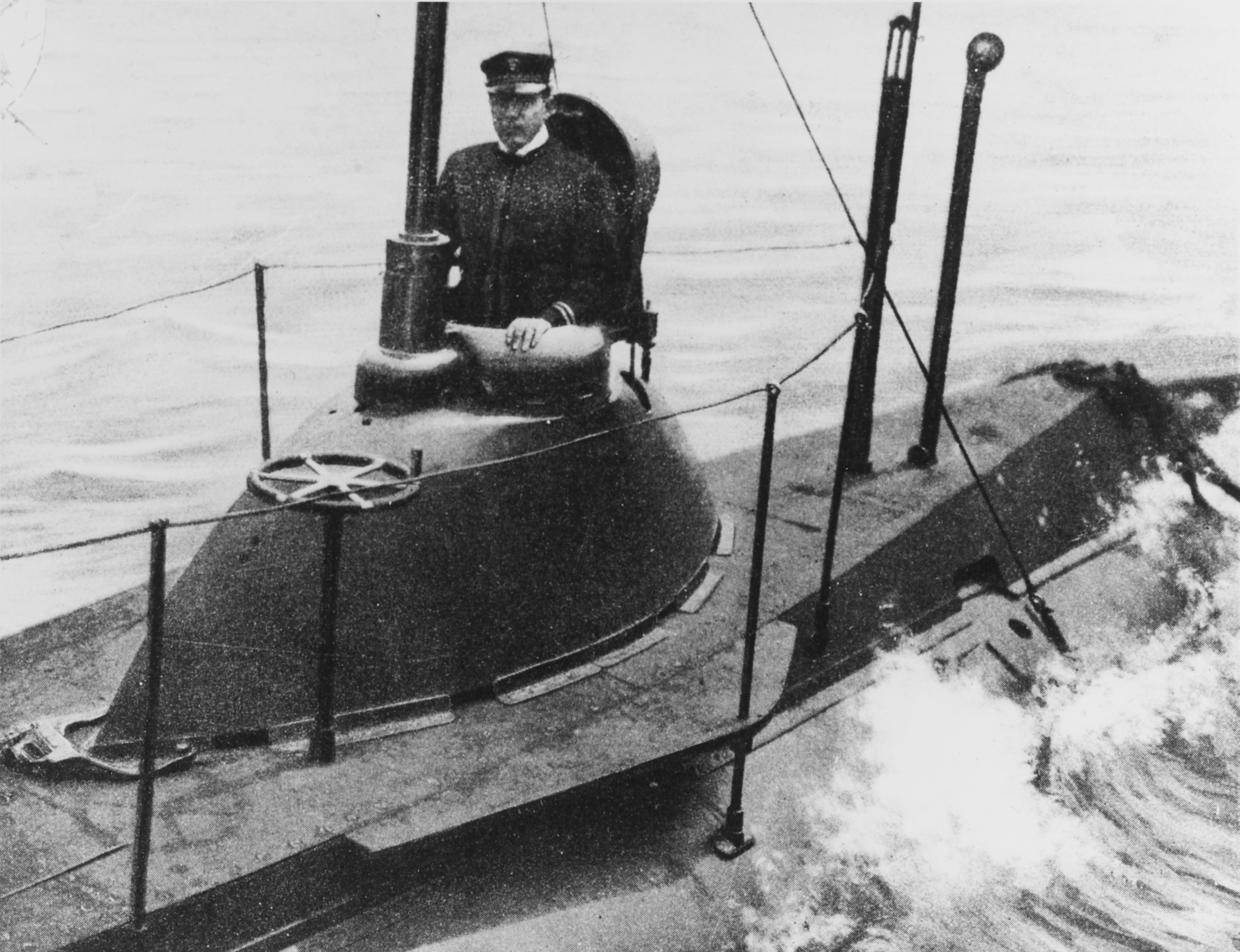
American submarine USS Plunger

The first practical submarines were developed in the late 19th century, but it was only after the development of the torpedo that submarines became truly dangerous (and hence useful). By the end of the First World War submarines had proved their potential. During the Second World War Nazi Germany's fleet of U-boats (submarines) almost starved Britain into submission and inflicted huge losses on US coastal shipping. The success of submarines led to the development of new anti-submarine convoy escorts during the First and Second World Wars, such as the destroyer escort. Confusingly, many of these new types adopted the names of the smaller warships from the age of sail, such as corvette, sloop and frigate.

===== Development of the aircraft carrier =====
A seaplane tender is a ship that supports the operation of seaplanes. Some of these vessels, known as seaplane carriers, could not only carry seaplanes but also provided all the facilities needed for their operation; these ships are regarded by some as the first aircraft carriers and appeared just before the First World War.

A major shift in naval warfare occurred with the introduction of the aircraft carrier. First at Taranto and then at Pearl Harbor, the aircraft carrier demonstrated its ability to strike decisively at enemy ships out of sight and range of surface vessels. By the end of the Second World War, the carrier had become the dominant warship.

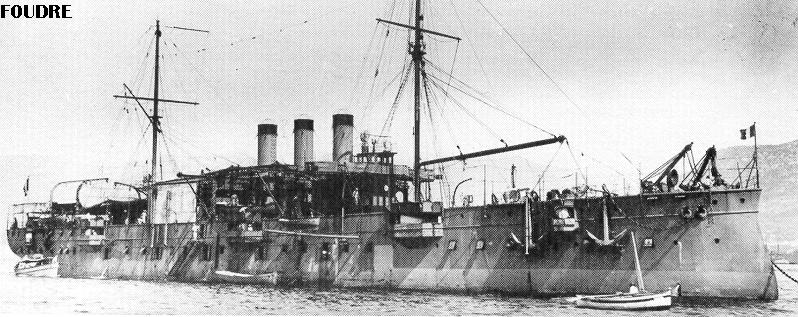
Foudre, the first seaplane carrier circa 1914.

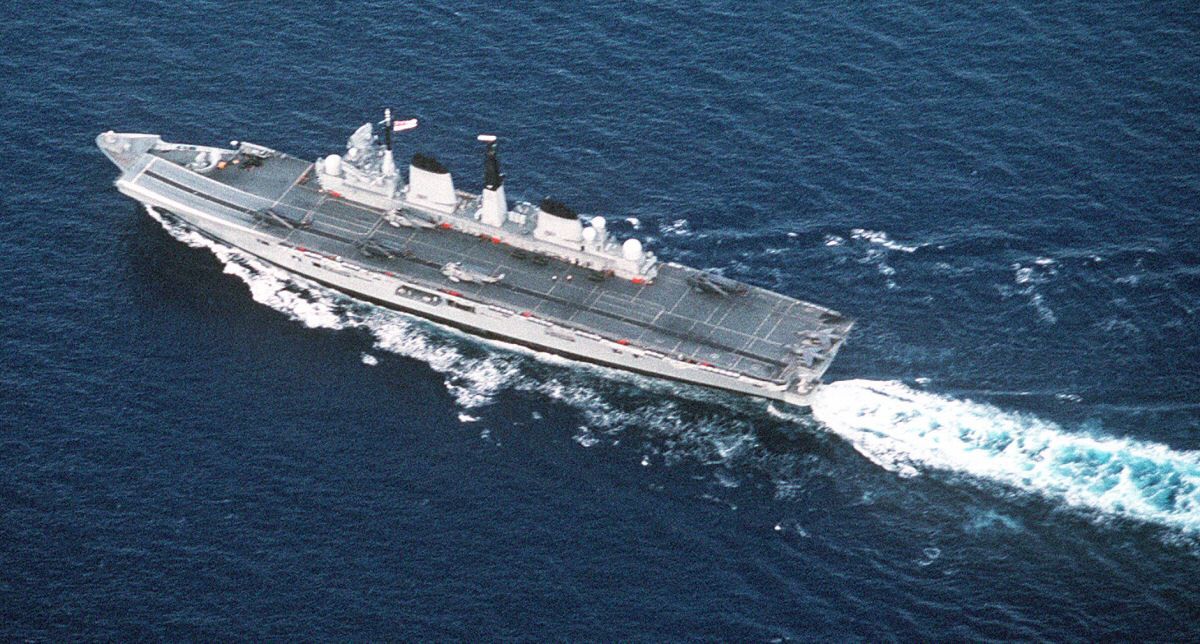
HMS Invincible (1991), a light aircraft carrier

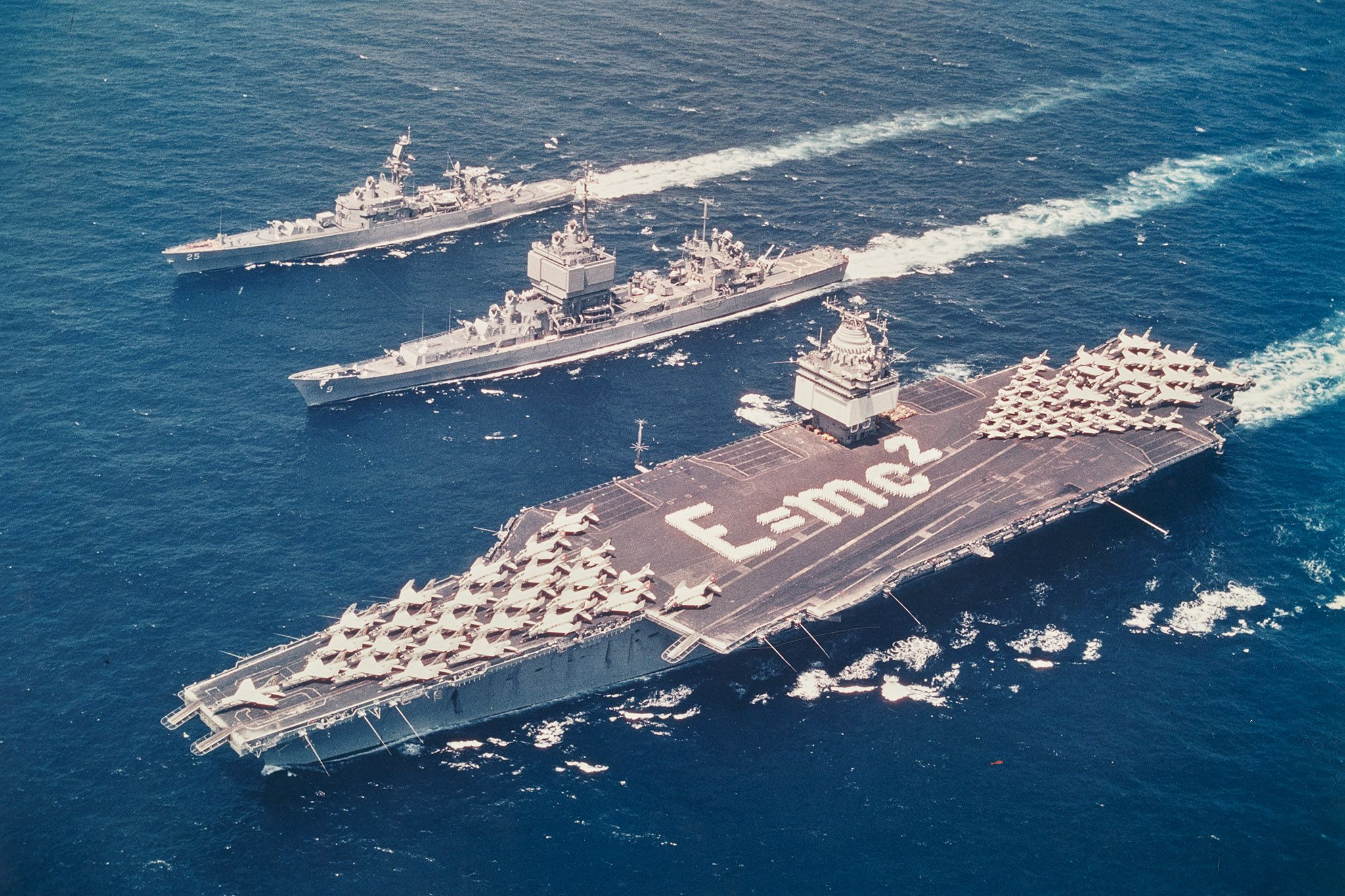
USS Enterprise (1961) and escorts

===== Development of the amphibious assault ship =====
Shinshū Maru was a ship of the Imperial Japanese Army during World War II. She was the world's first purpose-built landing craft carrier ship, and a pioneer of modern-day amphibious assault ships. During some of her operations, she was known to have used at least four cover names, R1, GL, MT, and Ryujo Maru.

An amphibious warfare ship is an amphibious vehicle warship employed to land and support ground forces, such as marines, on enemy territory during an amphibious assault. Specialized shipping can be divided into two types, most crudely described as ships and craft. In general, the ships carry the troops from the port of embarkation to the drop point for the assault and the craft carry the troops from the ship to the shore. Amphibious assaults taking place over short distances can also involve the shore-to-shore technique, where landing craft go directly from the port of embarkation to the assault point. Amphibious assault ships have a well deck with landing craft which can carry tanks and other armoured fighting vehicles and also have a deck like a helicopter carrier for helicopters and V/STOL aircraft.

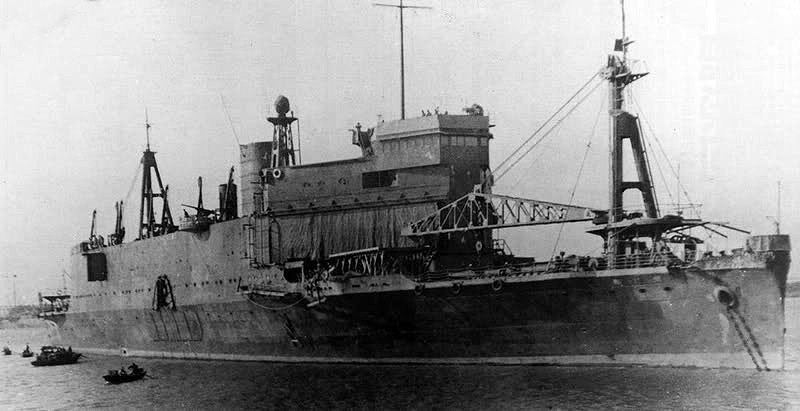
Japanese amphibious assault ship Shinshū Maru

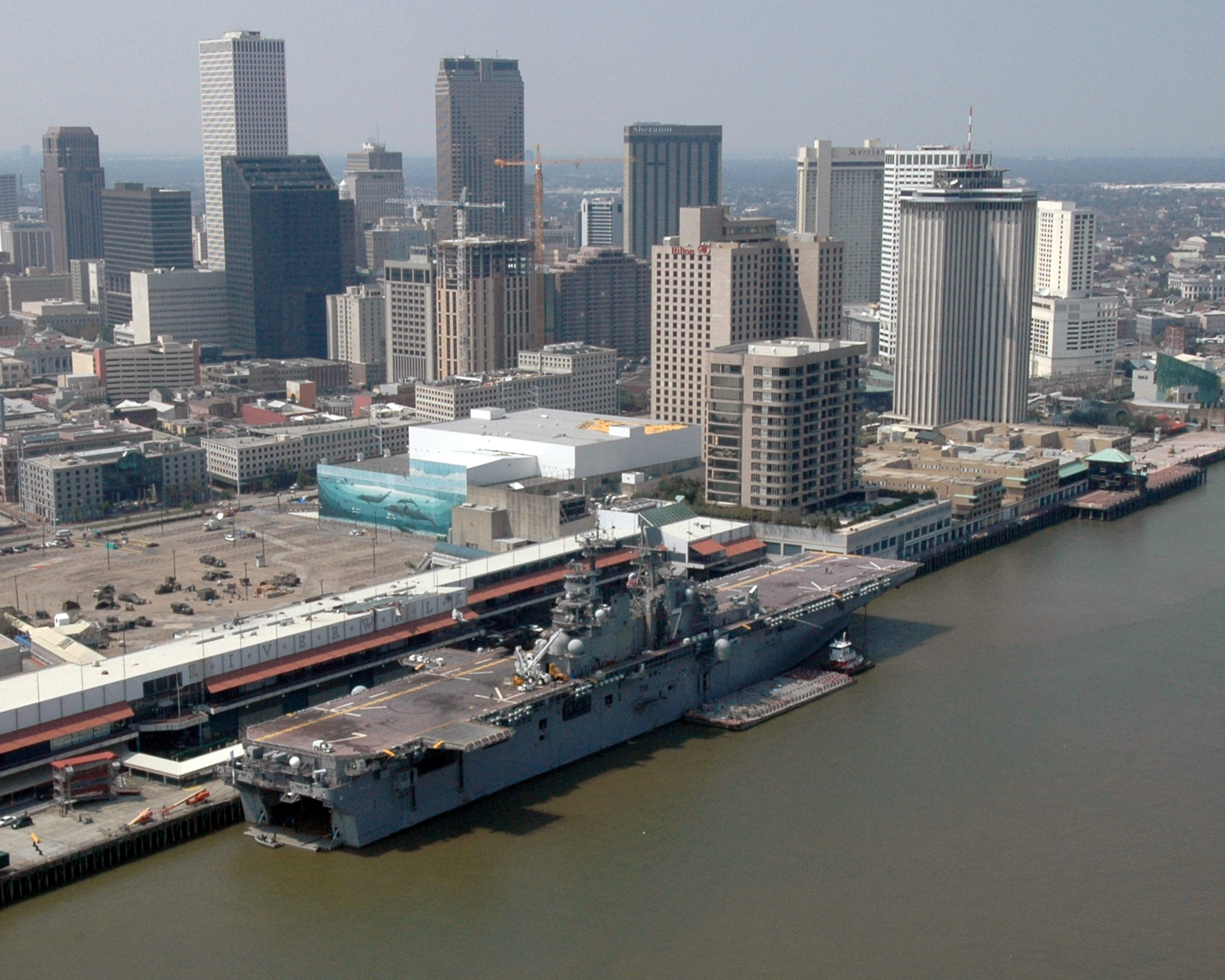
USS Iwo Jima at New Orleans, 2005

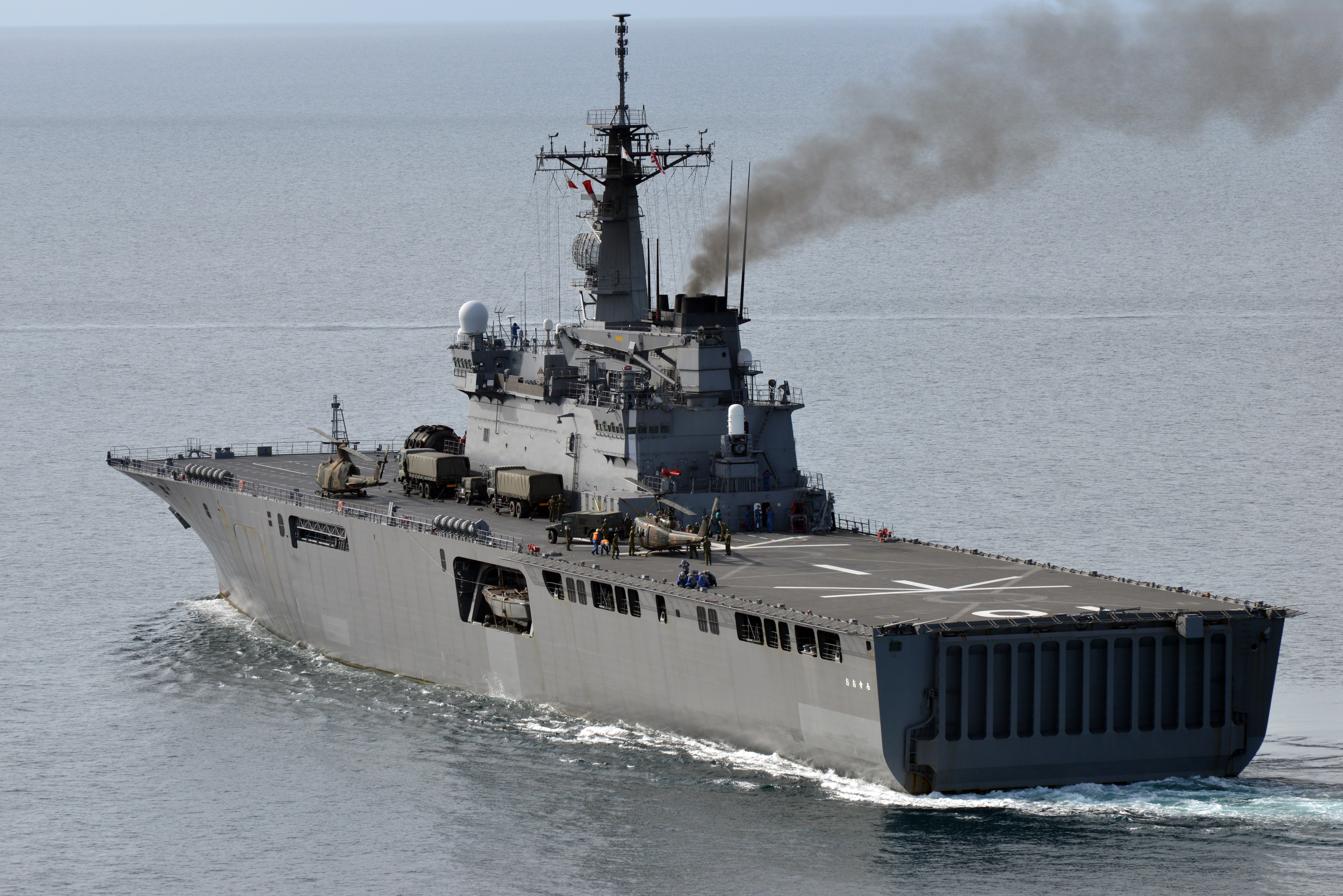
Stern view of Ōsumi-class tank landing ship

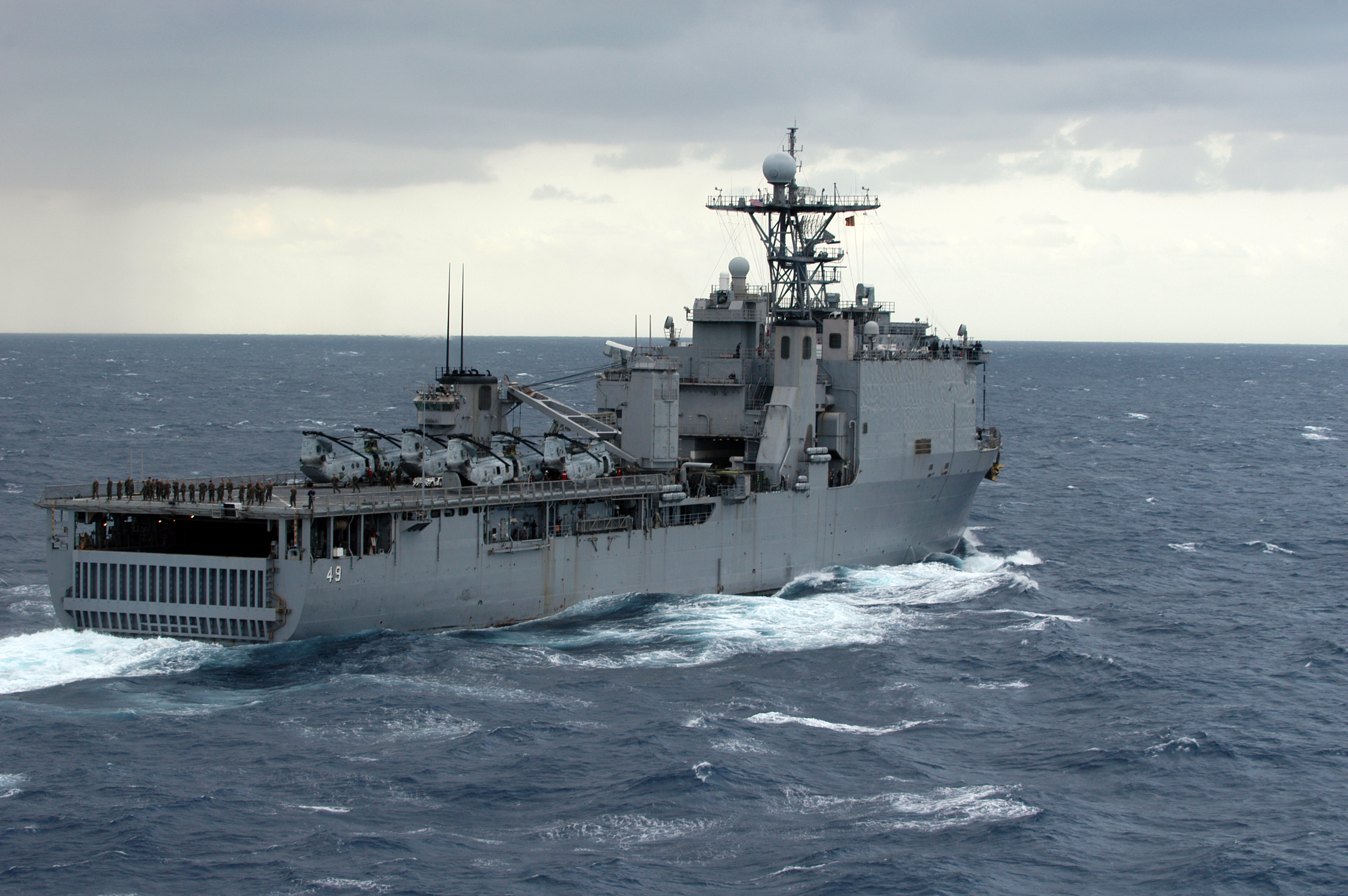
USS Harpers Ferry, a United States Navy dock landing ship

== See also ==
- List of naval ship classes in service
- Amphibious assault submarine
- Unmanned surface vehicle
- Autonomous underwater vehicle
