= List of ship launches in 1899 =

The list of ship launches in 1899 is a chronological list of ships launched in 1899.

Date	Ship	Class / type	Builder	Location	Country	Notes
11 January	Spiteful	Spiteful-class destroyer	Palmers Shipbuilding and Iron Company	Jarrow	United Kingdom	For Royal Navy
12 January	Noémi	Schooner	Ateliers et Chantiers de la Loire	Saint-Nazaire	France	For Soc. Anonyme des Voliers de St. Nazaire
14 January	Amiral Courbet	Steamship	Forges et Chantiers de la Méditerranée	Le Havre	France	For Cie. Française de Navigation à Vapeur Chargeurs Réunis
14 January	Oceanic	Ocean liner	Harland and Wolff	Belfast	United Kingdom	For White Star Line
30 January	Moorabool	Steamship	Blyth Shipbuilding Co. Ltd	Blyth	United Kingdom	For Huddart Parker & Co. Pty. Ltd.
11 February	Durandal	Durandal-class destroyer	Chantiers et Ateliers Augustin Normand	Le Havre	France	For French Navy
13 February	Energy	Tug	Allsup & Co. Ltd.	Preston	United Kingdom	For Mayor, Aldermen & Burgesses of the Borough of Preston.
February	Albany	New Orleans-class protected cruiser	Armstrong Whitworth	Newcastle upon Tyne	United Kingdom	For United States Navy
February	Torpilleur N° 233	37-Metre type Normand (1897 tranche)	Schneider-Creusot	Chalon-sur-Saône	France	For French Navy
February	Torpilleur N° 234	37-Metre type Normand (1897 tranche)	Schneider-Creusot	Chalon-sur-Saône	France	For French Navy
11 March	Glory	Canopus-class battleship	Cammell Laird	Birkenhead	United Kingdom	For Royal Navy
11 March	Implacable	Formidable-class battleship	HMNB Devonport	Devonport	United Kingdom	For Royal Navy
11 March	Winifredian	Passenger ship	Harland & Wolff	Belfast	United Kingdom	For F. Leyland & Co.
13 March	Asahi	Battleship	John Brown & Company	Glasgow	United Kingdom	For Imperial Japanese Navy
30 March	Peterel	Spiteful-class destroyer	Palmers Shipbuilding and Iron Company	Jarrow	United Kingdom	For Royal Navy
13 April	Warwick	Steamship	Blyth Shipbuilding Co. Ltd	Blyth	United Kingdom	For Warwick Steamship Co. Ltd.
18 April	Saxonia	Cargo ship	Flensburger Schiffbau-Gesellschaft	Flensburg	Germany	For Hamburg America Line
27 April	Ville de Mulhouse	Steamship	Forges et Chantiers de la Méditerranée	Le Havre	France	For Cie. Havraise Péninsulaire de Navigation à Vapeur
May	Torpilleur N° 235	37-Metre type Normand (1897 tranche)	Schneider-Creusot	Chalon-sur-Saône	France	For French Navy
6 May	Torpilleur N° 230	37-Metre type Normand (1897 tranche)	Chantiers et Ateliers de la Gironde	Lormont	France	For French Navy
8 May	Gromoboi	Armoured cruiser	Baltic Works	St Petersburg	Russia	For Imperial Russian Navy
29 May	Dahlgren	Torpedo boat	Bath Iron Works	Bath, Maine	United States	For United States Navy
June	Torpilleur N° 231	37-Metre type Normand (1897 tranche)	Chantiers et Ateliers de la Gironde	Lormont	France	For French Navy
June	Torpilleur N° 232	37-Metre type Normand (1897 tranche)	Chantiers et Ateliers de la Gironde	Lormont	France	For French Navy
1 June	Kaiser Wilhelm der Grosse	Kaiser Friedrich III-class battleship	Germaniawerft	Kiel	Germany	For Imperial German Navy
8 June	Jeanne d'Arc	Armoured cruiser	Arsenal de Toulon	Toulon	France	For French Navy
8 June	Hallebarde	Durandal-class destroyer	Chantiers et Ateliers Augustin Normand	Le Havre	France	For French Navy
8 June	France	Steamship	Forges et Chantiers de la Méditerranée	Le Havre	France	For Cie. des Chemins de Fer de l'Ouest
10 June	Stringham	Torpedo boat	Harlan & Hollingsworth	Wilmington, Delaware	United States	For United States Navy
24 June	Azuma	Armored cruiser	Ateliers et Chantiers de la Loire	Saint-Nazaire	France	For Imperial Japanese Navy
26 June	Jurien de la Gravière	Protected cruiser	Arsenal de Lorient	Lorient	France	For French Navy
26 June	Gagara	Torpedo boat	Neva Shipyard	St Petersburg	Russia	For Imperial Russian Navy
27 June	Hatsuse	Shikishima-class battleship	Armstrong Whitworth	Newcastle upon Tyne	United Kingdom	For Imperial Japanese Navy
28 June	Cobra	Destroyer	Armstrong Whitworth	Newcastle upon Tyne	United Kingdom	For Royal Navy
28 June	Pioneer	Pelorus-class cruiser	HM Dockyard Chatham	Chatham, Kent	United Kingdom	For Royal Navy
28 June	Somerford	Steamship	Blyth Shipbuilding Co. Ltd	Blyth	United Kingdom	For Speeding & Marshall Steam Shipping Co. Ltd.
29 June	Giuseppe Garibaldi	Giuseppe Garibaldi-class cruiser	Gio. Ansaldo & C.	Sestri Ponente, Genoa	Italy	For Regia Marina
30 June	Chesapeake	Barque	Bath Iron Works	Bath, Maine	United States	For United States Navy
6 July	Floriano	Deodoro-class coastal defense ship	Forges et Chantiers de la Méditerranée	La Seyne	France	For Brazilian Navy
8 July	Yakumo	Armoured cruiser	Stettiner Vulcan AG	Stettin	Germany	For Imperial Japanese Navy
11 July	Montezuma	Cargo liner	Alexander Stephen and Sons	Glasgow	United Kingdom	For Elder Dempster Lines
18 July	Niobe	Gazelle-class cruiser	AG Weser	Bremen	Germany	For Imperial German Navy
22 July	Torpilleur N° 227	37-Metre type Normand (1897 tranche)	Forges et Chantiers de la Méditerranée	Le Havre	France	For French Navy
22 July	Ville du Havre	—	Forges et Chantiers de la Méditerranée	Le Havre	France	For Cie. Havraise Péninsulaire de Navigation à Vapeur
25 July	Suffren	Pre-dreadnought battleship	Arsenal de Brest	Brest	France	For French Navy
25 July	Vengeance	Canopus-class battleship	Vickers	Barrow in Furness	United Kingdom	For Royal Navy
27 July	Awa Maru	Ocean liner	Mitsubishi Shipbuilding & Engineering Co	Nagasaki	Japan	For Nippon Yusen
29 July	Goldsborough	Torpedo boat	Wolff & Zwicker Iron Works	Portland, Maine	United States	For United States Navy
6 August	Varese	Giuseppe Garibaldi-class cruiser	Cantiere navale fratelli Orlando	Livorno	Italy	For Regia Marina
21 August	Torpilleur N° 228	37-Metre type Normand (1897 tranche)	Forges et Chantiers de la Méditerranée	Le Havre	France	For French Navy
29 August	Myg	Torpedo boat	Navy Yard	Karljohansvern	Norway	For Royal Norwegian Navy
August	Pallada	Pallada-class cruiser	Admiralty Shipyard	St Petersburg	Russia	For Imperial Russian Navy
6 September	Viper	Viper-class destroyer	R. & W. Hawthorn, Leslie & Co. Ltd.	Newcastle upon Tyne	United Kingdom	For Royal Navy.
7 September	Persic	Passenger ship	Harland & Wolff	Belfast	United Kingdom	For White Star Line.
9 September	Habsburg	Habsburg-class battleship	STT	Trieste	Austria-Hungary	For Austro-Hungarian Navy
16 September	Hansa	Passenger ship	William Lindbergs Verkstads- och Varfs AB	Stockholm	Sweden	For Ångfartygs AB Gotland, Visby
20 September	La Lorraine	Ocean liner	Compagnie Générale Transatlantique	St. Nazaire	France	For Compagnie Générale Transatlantique
20 September	Rhein	Ocean liner	Blohm + Voss	Hamburg	Germany	For Norddeutscher Lloyd
21 September	London	London-class battleship	Portsmouth Dockyard	Portsmouth	United Kingdom	For Royal Navy
23 September	Henri IV	Pre-dreadnought battleship	Arsenal de Cherbourg	Cherbourg	France	For French Navy
25 September	Craven	Torpedo boat	Bath Iron Works	Bath, Maine	United States	For United States Navy
30 September	Diana	Pallada-class cruiser	Admiralty Shipyard	St Petersburg	Russia	For Imperial Russian Navy
5 October	Torpilleur N° 212	37-Metre type Normand (1897 tranche)	Chantiers et Ateliers Augustin Normand	Le Havre	France	For French Navy
5 October	Michigan	Passenger ship	Harland & Wolff	Belfast	United Kingdom	For Atlantic Transport Co.
7 October	Ville de Dijon	Four-masted barque	Forges et Chantiers de la Méditerranée	Le Havre	France	For Cie. des Voiliers Havrais
7 October	El Cid	Cargo ship	Newport News Shipbuilding and Dry Dock Company	Newport News, Virginia	United States	For Southern Pacific Steamship Company
18 October	Bulwark	London-class battleship	HMNB Devonport	Devonport	United Kingdom	For Royal Navy
18 October	Kaiser Karl der Grosse	Kaiser Friedrich III-class battleship	Blohm + Voss	Hamburg	Germany	For Imperial German Navy
19 October	Everingham	Steamship	Blyth Shipbuilding Co. Ltd	Blyth	United Kingdom	For East Yorkshire Steamship Co. Ltd.
21 October	Galeka	Ocean liner	Harland and Wolff	Belfast	United Kingdom	For Union-Castle Line
21 October	Narval	Submarine	Arsenal de Cherbourg	Cherbourg	France	For French Navy
31 October	Sir Walter Scott	Steamship	Wm. Denny & Bros.	Dumbarton	United Kingdom	
31 October	Shubrick	Torpedo boat	William Trigg Company	Richmond, Virginia	United States	For United States Navy
31 October	Varyag	Cruiser	William Cramp & Sons	Philadelphia, Pennsylvania	United States	For Imperial Russian Navy
2 November	Venerable	London-class battleship	HM Dockyard Chatham	Chatham, Kent	United Kingdom	For Royal Navy
3 November	Torpilleur N° 213	37-Metre type Normand (1897 tranche)	Chantiers et Ateliers Augustin Normand	Le Havre	France	For French Navy
18 November	Minneapolis	Passenger ship	Harland & Wolff	Belfast	United Kingdom	For Atlantic Transport Co.
18 November	Sutlej	Cressy-class cruiser	John Brown & Company	Clydebank	United Kingdom	For Royal Navy
21 November	Nymphe	Gazelle-class cruiser	Germaniawerft	Kiel	Germany	For Imperial German Navy
25 November	Hamburg	Barbarossa-class ocean liner	AG Vulcan	Stettin	Germany	For Hamburg America Line
2 December	Grosser Kurfürst	Ocean liner	F Schichau	Danzig	Germany	For Norddeutsche Lloyd
4 December	Cressy	Cressy-class cruiser	Fairfield Shipbuilding & Engineering Co Ltd	Govan	United Kingdom	For Royal Navy
5 December	Bailey	Torpedo boat	Gas Engine & Power Company / Charles L Seabury Company	Morris Heights, New York	United States	For United States Navy
5 December	Gelderland	Steamship	Blyth Shipbuilding & Dry Docks Co. Ltd	Blyth	United Kingdom	For N.V. Scheepvaart en Steenkolen Maatschappij.
9 December	Claes Uggla	Torpedo cruiser	Bergsunds Shipyard	Stockholm	Sweden	For Royal Swedish Navy
15 December	Potsdam	Ocean Liner	Blohm + Voss	Hamburg	Germany	For Holland-America Line
16 December	Torpilleur N° 214	37-Metre type Normand (1897 tranche)	Chantiers et Ateliers Augustin Normand	Le Havre	France	For French Navy
16 December	Saxonia	Ocean liner	John Brown & Company	Clydebank	United Kingdom	For Cunard Line
20 December	Anglia	Ferry	William Denny and Brothers	Dumbarton	United Kingdom	For London and North Western Railway
21 December	Saxon	Passenger ship	Harland & Wolff	Belfast	United Kingdom	For Union Steamship Co.
23 December	Virginia	Yacht	Bath Iron Works	Bath, Maine	United States	For Isaac Stern
31 December	Tashmoo	Paddle steamer	Detroit Shipbuilding Company	Detroit	United States	For White Star Line, ~Detroit
Unknown date	Albatros	Ketch	Kalkman	Capelle aan den IJssel	Netherlands	Last commercially trading cargo sailing ship in Europe.
Unknown date	Corsair	Yacht	W. & A. Fletcher Company	Hoboken, New Jersey	United States	For J. P. Morgan, Jr.
Unknown date	Eidsvold	Eidsvold-class coastal defence ship	Armstrong Whitworth	Newcastle upon Tyne	United Kingdom	For Royal Norwegian Navy
Unknown date	Eugenia	Yacht	John Roach and Sons	Chester, Pennsylvania	United States	
Unknown date	Florence	Barge	Allsup & Co. Ltd.	Preston	United Kingdom	For private owner.
Unknown date	Ivernia	Ocean liner	Swan Hunter & Wigham Richardson	Newcastle upon Tyne	United Kingdom	For Cunard Line
Unknown date	Jack T Scully	Tugboat	A C Brown	Tottenville, New York	United States	For Neptune Line
Unknown date	Köln	Ocean Liner		Geestemunde	Germany	For Norddeutscher Lloyd
Unknown date	Korea	Passenger liner	Flensburger Schiffsbaugesellschaft	Flensburg, Germany	Germany	for Russian East Asiatic Steamship Company
Unknown date	Leona	Paddle steamer		Portland, Oregon	United States	For Oregon City Transportation Company
Unknown date	Luckenbach No. 3	Tugboat	Neafie and Levy	Philadelphia, Pennsylvania	United States	For Luckenbach Steamship Company
Unknown date	Lykens	Tugboat	Neafie and Levy Ship and Engine Building Company	Philadelphia, Pennsylvania	United States	For the Reading Company
Unknown date	Marie	Cargo ship	Neptun AG.	Rostock	Germany	For Flensburger Dampschiff Gesellschaft.
Unknown date	Maud	Norfolk wherry	D S Hall	Reedham, Norfolk	United Kingdom	For Walter Bunn
Unknown date	Mont-Blanc	Tramp steamer	Sir Raylton Dixon & Co	Middlesbrough	United Kingdom	For Compagnie Générale Transatlantique
Unknown date	Norge	Eidsvold-class coastal defence ship	Armstrong Whitworth	Newcastle upon Tyne	United Kingdom	For Royal Norwegian Navy
Unknown date	Olive	Passenger ship	Beeching & Co.	Great Yarmouth	United Kingdom	For Laura Beeching.
Unknown date	Only Son	Humber Keel	Brown & Clapson	Barton-upon-Humber	United Kingdom	For John Charles Raper.
Unknown date	Patrol	Harbor launch		Jersey City, Illinois	United States	
Unknown date	Petschora	Paddle steamer	Allsup & Co. Ltd.	Preston	United Kingdom	For private owner.
Unknown date	Pioneer	Steamboat	Allsup & Co. Ltd.	Preston	United Kingdom	For William Monk Jr.
Unknown date	Piscator	Steam drifter	Beeching Brothers Ltd.	Great Yarmouth	United Kingdom	For Henry F. Eastick and others.
Unknown date	Söderhamn	Cargo ship	Helsingørs Jernskib-og Maskinbyggeri A/S	Helsingør	Denmark	
Unknown date	Stag	Destroyer	John I. Thornycroft & Company	Woolston, Hampshire	United Kingdom	For Royal Navy
Unknown date	Toroa	Coaster	Allsup & Co. Ltd.	Preston	United Kingdom	For Richardson & Co. Ltd.
