= List of ship launches in 1898 =

The list of ship launches in 1898 is a chronological list of ships launched in 1898.

Date	Ship	Class / type	Builder	Location	Country	Notes
5 January	Amphitrite	Diadem-class cruiser	Vickers Limited	Barrow-in-Furness	United Kingdom	
12 January	Torpilleur N° 210	37-Metre type Normand (1896 Tranche)	Chantiers et Ateliers de la Gironde	Lormont	France	For the French Navy
24 January	Argonaut	Diadem-class cruiser	Fairfield Shipbuilding and Engineering Company	Govan, Scotland	United Kingdom	
10 February	Bullfinch	Bullfinch-class destroyer		Kingston upon Hull	United Kingdom	
12 February	Torpilleur N° 211	37-Metre type Normand (1896 Tranche)	Chantiers et Ateliers de la Gironde	Lormont	France	For the French Navy
22 February	Mermaid	Mermaid-class destroyer	Hawthorn Leslie and Company	Newcastle-upon-Tyne	United Kingdom	
26 February	City of Erie	Paddle steamer	Detroit Dry Dock Company	Wyandotte, Michigan	United States	
7 March	Thor	Oden-class coastal defence ship	Bergsunds Shipyard	Stockholm	Sweden	
21 March	Dove	Bullfinch-class destroyer		Kingston upon Hull	United Kingdom	
23 March	Goliath	Canopus-class battleship	Chatham Dockyard	Chatham, Kent	United Kingdom	
24 March	Kearsarge	Kearsarge-class battleship	Newport News Shipbuilding & Dry Dock Company	Newport News, Virginia	United States	
24 March	Kentucky	Kearsarge-class battleship	Newport News Shipbuilding & Dry Dock Company	Newport News, Virginia	United States	
30 March	Niord	Oden-class coastal defence ship	Lindholmens Shipyard	Lindholmen, Gothenburg	Sweden	
31 March	Gazelle	Gazelle-class cruiser	Germaniawerft	Kiel	Germany	
April	Torpilleur N° 221	37-Metre type Normand (1897 Tranche)	Ateliers et Chantiers de la Loire	Nantes	France	For the French Navy
April	Torpilleur N° 216	37-Metre type Normand (1897 Tranche)	Schneider et Cie.	Le Creusot	France	For the French Navy
7 April	Hermes	Highflyer-class cruiser	Fairfield Shipbuilding and Engineering Company	Govan, Scotland	United Kingdom	
7 April	New England	Passenger ship	Harland & Wolff	Belfast	United Kingdom	For Richard Mills & Co.
7 April	New England	Ocean liner	Harland and Wolff	Belfast	United Kingdom	For the Dominion Line
19 April	Ernest Siegfried	Four-masted barque	Forges et Chantiers de la Méditerranée	Le Havre	France	For E.Corblet & Cie.
21 April	Torpilleur N° 222	37-Metre type Normand (1897 Tranche)	Ateliers et Chantiers de la Loire	Nantes	France	For the French Navy
21 April	Sampo	Icebreaker	Armstrong Whitworth	Newcastle upon Tyne	United Kingdom	For Finnish Board of Navigation
21 April	William Broadley	Steamship	Blyth Shipbuilding Co. Ltd	Blyth	United Kingdom	For Red 'R' Steamship Co. Ltd.
22 April	Ariadne	Diadem-class cruiser	J & G Thompson	Clydebank	United Kingdom	
May	Torpilleur N° 217	37-Metre type Normand (1897 Tranche)	Schneider et Cie.	Le Creusot	France	For the French Navy
7 May	Statendam	Ocean liner	Harland and Wolff	Belfast	United Kingdom	For the Holland America Line
7 May	São Gabriel	São Gabriel-class cruiser	Forges et Chantiers de la Méditerranée	Le Havre	France	For the Portuguese Navy
12 May	Châteaurenault	Protected cruiser	Forges et Chantiers de la Méditerranée	La Seyne	France	For the French Navy
18 May	Alabama	Illinois-class battleship	William Cramp & Sons	Philadelphia, Pennsylvania	United States	
June	Torpilleur N° 218	37-Metre type Normand (1897 Tranche)	Schneider et Cie.	Le Creusot	France	For the French Navy
1 June	Storm	1.-class torpedo boat	Karljohansvern naval yard	Horten, Norway	Norway	
4 June	Bay State	Cargo ship	Harland & Wolff	Belfast	United Kingdom	For George Warren & Co.
4 June	Highflyer	Highflyer-class cruiser	Fairfield Shipbuilding and Engineering Company	Govan, Scotland	United Kingdom	
4 June	Ultonia	Cargo liner	Swan Hunter & Wigham Richardson	Wallsend	United Kingdom	For the Cunard Line
18 June	Deodoro	Deodoro-class coastal defense ship	Forges et Chantiers de la Méditerranée	La Seyne	France	For the Brazilian Navy
21 June	Albion	Canopus-class battleship	Thames Iron Works	London	United Kingdom	
July	Torpilleur N° 219	37-Metre type Normand (1897 Tranche)	Schneider et Cie.	Le Creusot	France	For the French Navy
5 July	Ocean	Canopus-class battleship	Devonport Dockyard	Devonport	United Kingdom	
5 July	São Rafael	São Gabriel-class cruiser	Forges et Chantiers de la Méditerranée	Le Havre	France	For the Portuguese Navy
9 July	Alcyon	Steam ferry	Forges et Chantiers de la Méditerranée	La Seyne	France	For: Soc. des bateaux à vapeur La Seyne-Toulon
19 July	Sinaï	Steamship	Forges et Chantiers de la Méditerranée	La Seyne	France	For: Cie. des Messageries Maritimes
August	Torpilleur N° 220	37-Metre type Normand (1897 Tranche)	Schneider et Cie.	Le Creusot	France	For the French Navy
4 August	German	Passenger ship	Harland & Wolff	Belfast	United Kingdom	For Union Steamship Co.
18 August	Sigrid	Steamship	Blyth Shipbuilding Co. Ltd	Blyth	United Kingdom	For Russische Baltische Dampfschffahrts Gessellschaft.
19 July	Chodoc	Steamship	Forges et Chantiers de la Méditerranée	La Seyne	France	For: Cie. Nationale de Navigation
1 September	Iéna	Pre-dreadnought battleship	Arsenal de Brest	Brest	France	
5 September	Longbenton	Steamship	Blyth Shipbuilding Co. Ltd	Blyth	United Kingdom	For T. & W. Smith.
17 September	Río de la Plata	Protected cruiser	Forges et Chantiers de la Méditerranée	Le Havre	France	For Spanish Navy.
22 September	Brand	1.-class torpedo boat	Karljohansvern naval yard	Horten, Norway	Norway	
4 October	Illinois	Illinois-class battleship	Newport News Shipbuilding & Dry Dock Company	Newport News, Virginia	United States	
14 October	Rimu	Coaster	Allsup & Co. Ltd.	Preston	United Kingdom	For Keith Ramsay.
27 October	Hyacinth	Highflyer-class cruiser	London and Glasgow Shipbuilding Company	Glasgow	United Kingdom	
27 October	Spartiate	Diadem-class cruiser	Royal Navy Dockyard	Pembroke Dock	United Kingdom	
October	Albion	Norfolk wherry	W Brighton	Oulton Broad	United Kingdom	For WD & AE Walker, Bungay
1 November	Shikishima	Shikishima-class battleship	Thames Ironworks	Leamouth, London	United Kingdom	For Imperial Japanese Navy
3 November	Duchess	Paddle steamer ferry	S. & W. Lawrence	Scarborough, Perth	Western Australia	For South Perth Ferry Company.
6 November	Afric	Passenger ship	Harland & Wolff	Belfast	United Kingdom	For White Star Line.
15 November	Dwarf	Bramble-class Gunboat	London and Glasgow Shipbuilding Company	Govan	United Kingdom	
16 November	Afric	Jubilee-class ocean liner	Harland and Wolff	Belfast	United Kingdom	For the White Star Line
17 November	Formidable	Formidable-class battleship	Portsmouth Dockyard	Portsmouth	United Kingdom	
26 November	Bramble	Bramble-class Gunboat	W.H. Potter & Sons	Liverpool	United Kingdom	
26 November	Wisconsin	Illinois-class battleship	Union Iron Works	San Francisco, California	United States	
29 November	Emilie Siegfried	Four-masted barque	Forges et Chantiers de la Méditerranée	Le Havre	France	For: E.Corblet & Cie.
1 December	Aphrodite	Yacht	Bath Iron Works	Bath, Maine	United States	For Col. O H Payne
4 December	Fulmine	Destroyer	Cantieri navali Odero	Sestri Ponente	Kingdom of Italy	For Regia Marina
15 December	Irresistible	Formidable-class battleship	Chatham Dockyard	Chatham, Kent	United Kingdom	For Royal Navy
15 December	Medic	Jubilee-class ocean liner	Harland and Wolff	Belfast	United Kingdom	For the White Star Line
Date unknown	Hope	Humber Keel	Brown & Clapson	Barton-upon-Humber	United Kingdom	For George Hill.
Date unknown	Kittiwake	Lightship	Allsup & Co. Ltd.	Preston	United Kingdom	For Commissioners of Irish Lights.
Date unknown	Majestic	Tug	Cleland Graving Dock & Slipway Co.	Wallsend	United Kingdom	For private owner.
Date unknown	Phaedra	Cargo ship	G. Seebeck AG	Bremerhaven	Germany	For Neptun Line.
