= HMS Peterel =

Seven ships of the Royal Navy have borne the name HMS Peterel:

- HMS Peterel (1777) (ex-Duchess of Manchester) was a survey sloop, purchased in 1777 and sold in 1788.
- HMS Peterel (1794) (also known as Peterell) was a 16-gun sloop launched in 1794. In 1798 she was captured by four Spanish frigates off Minorca, but was recaptured the next day by HMS Argo. She was sold in 1827.
- HMS Peterel (1838) was a 6-gun packet brig-sloop launched in 1838 and sold off in 1862.
- HMS Peterel (1860) was a wooden screw Rosario-class sloop launched in 1860 and sold off in 1901.
- HMS Peterel (1899) was a Spiteful-class destroyer launched in 1899 and sold off in 1919.
- HMS Peterel (1927) was a river gunboat launched in 1927 and sunk in 1941.
- HMS Peterel (P262) was a Bird-class patrol vessel launched in 1976 and sold in 1991.
