= Douglas Nicholson =

Royal Navy Admiral (1867–1946)

Admiral Sir Douglas Nicholson KCMG KCVO
- Born: 4 March 1867
- Died: 8 February 1946 (aged 78)
- Military career
- Allegiance: United Kingdom
- Branch: Royal Navy
- Rank: Admiral
- Commands: HMS Hyacinth; HMS Hermes; HMS St Vincent; HMS Conqueror; Flag Officer, Royal Yachts; HMS Agincourt; 3rd Battle Squadron; Reserve Fleet
- Conflicts: Anglo-Egyptian War; World War I
- Awards: Knight Commander of the Order of St Michael and St George; Knight Commander of the Royal Victorian Order

Admiral Sir Douglas Romilly Lothian Nicholson, KCMG, KCVO (4 March 1867 – 8 February 1946) was a senior Royal Navy officer who commanded the Reserve Fleet.

== Naval career ==
Born the son of Sir Lothian Nicholson, a former Governor of Gibraltar, and Mary Romilly, Nicholson served in the Anglo-Egyptian War of 1882. He was appointed in command of the destroyer HMS Spiteful on 11 January 1901, as she was serving in home waters, and was in charge when she ran aground near the Isle of Wight the following month and during a collision with sister ship HMS Peterel in October. After a year with the Spiteful, he was appointed in command of HMS Dove on 24 February 1902, serving in the Channel Fleet as part of the Portsmouth instructional flotilla. In May 1902, the ship hit a rock off Kildorney, and had to be towed by her sister ship HMS Bullfinch to Queenstown, and later back to Portsmouth for repairs. Douglas and the crew transferred to the recently completed torpedo boat destroyer HMS Success, which was commissioned at Portsmouth on 9 June. The following day, the navy held a court-martial where he was tried for negligence during the Kildorney incident. He was acquitted of negligence, but severely reprimanded for being in error of judgment.

In December 1902, Nicholson was appointed to the seagoing training ship HMS Northampton, to serve in command of HMS Calliope, tender to the larger Northampton.

Nicholson became commanding officer of the cruiser HMS Hyacinth in August 1905, of the cruiser HMS Hermes in December 1905 and of the battleship HMS St Vincent in 1910. He went on to be commanding officer of the battleship HMS Conqueror in 1912 and Commodore of His Majesty's Yachts in 1913. He served in World War I as commanding officer of HMS Agincourt in the Grand Fleet from 1914. He continued his war service as Second-in-Command of the 3rd Battle Squadron from March 1917, as Second-in-Command of the 4th Battle Squadron from September 1917 and as Commander of the 3rd Battle Squadron from 1918.

He became Rear-Admiral, Reserve Fleet at Portland in 1919 and Vice-Admiral commanding the Reserve Fleet in 1922 before retiring in 1926.

Military offices
Preceded by Sir Richard Phillimore	Commander-in-Chief, Reserve Fleet; 1922–1923	Succeeded by Sir William Goodenough
