= HMS Bullfinch =

Four ships of the Royal Navy have been named Bullfinch.

- HMS Bullfinch (1856), an Albacore-class gunboat
- HMS Bullfinch (1868), a Plover-class gunvessel
- HMS Bullfinch (1898), a Bullfinch-class destroyer
- HMS Bullfinch (1940), a cable-laying ship
