= HMS Syren (1900) =

British destroyer

History

United Kingdom
- Name: Syren
- Namesake: Sirens
- Builder: Palmers, Jarrow
- Launched: 20 December 1900
- Fate: Sold, 1920 and scrapped

General characteristics
- Class & type: Myrmidon-class destroyer
- Displacement: 350 long tons (356 t)
- Length: 210 ft (64 m)
- Propulsion: 2 × Triple expansion steam engines; 4 × Coal-fired Reed water tube boilers; 6,200 hp (4,623 kW)
- Speed: 30 knots (56 km/h; 35 mph)
- Complement: 63
- Armament: 1 × QF 12-pounder gun; 2 × 18 inch (450 mm) torpedo tubes

HMS Syren was one of two Myrmidon-class destroyers which served with the Royal Navy. She was launched by Palmers in 1900 and served in home waters. Syren ran aground during manoeuvres off Ireland in 1905 and was badly damaged, requiring her bow to be reconstructed. During the First World War she served as part of the Dover Patrol and helped rescue the crew of the civilian steamship Harpalion which had been torpedoed. Syren was sold for scrap in 1920.

== Design and construction ==
In April 1899, the British Admiralty placed an order with the Jarrow shipbuilder Palmers Shipbuilding and Iron Company Limited for three torpedo boat destroyers, Peterel, Myrmidon and Syren, for the Royal Navy under a supplement to the 1898–1899 shipbuilding programme. (Note: In total this supplement to the programme authorised the purchase of four battleships, four cruisers and twelve destroyers.) with a contract price being £47149 per ship. Syren was laid down (as Yard number 752) on 24 November 1899, and was launched on 20 December 1900, completing in February 1902.

Syren closely resembled Spiteful, built by Palmers under the previous year's shipbuilding programme, and like Spiteful had four funnels. She was 219 feet 6 inches (66.90 m) long overall, with a beam of 20 feet 9 inches (6.32 m) and a draught of 8 feet 11 inches (2.72 m). Displacement was 370 long tons (380 t) light and 420 long tons (430 t) full load. Four Reed boilers fed steam at 250 pounds per square inch (1,700 kPa) to triple expansion steam engines rated at 6,200 indicated horsepower (4,600 kW) and driving two propeller shafts, giving a speed of 30 knots (56 km/h; 35 mph). 91 tons of coal were carried.

Armament was a single QF 12 pounder 12 cwt (3 in-calibre or 76 mm) gun on a platform on the ship's conning tower (in practice the platform was also used as the ship's bridge), backed up by five 6-pounder guns, and two 18 inch (450 mm) torpedo tubes.

== Service history ==
HMS Syren was commissioned at Portsmouth on 10 April 1902 by Lieutenant and Commander the Hon. Herbert Meade and the crew of the destroyer Teazer, taking the place of Teazer in the instructional flotilla. Less than a month later, she had one of her funnels damaged in a collision with the service yacht Hawk off Portsmouth. She was quickly repaired at Devonport, re-joined the flotilla in mid-June, and took part in the fleet review held at Spithead on 16 August 1902 for the coronation of King Edward VII.

In September 1902 she ran a series of trials to test Reed′s automatic lubricator, with the Commander-in-Chief at Portsmouth, Admiral Sir Charles Frederick Hotham on board. Lieutenant Henry Brocklebank was appointed in command on 5 November 1902.

Whilst under the command of Sidney Olivier, Syren ran aground at Berehaven, Ireland during naval manoeuvres on 1 May 1905. She was badly damaged, with the forward part of the ship wrecked, but the aft part of the ship was salvaged and a new bow constructed.

Syren was part of the 4th Destroyer Flotilla in 1910. On 30 August 1912 the Admiralty directed all destroyers were to be grouped into classes designated by letters based on contract speed and appearance. As a four-funneled 30-knotter destroyer, Syren was assigned to the B Class. In 1912, older destroyers were organised into Patrol Flotillas, with Syren being part of the 6th Flotilla, based at Portsmouth, in March 1913. She remained part of the 6th Flotilla in July 1914, on the eve of the outbreak of the First World War.

=== First World War ===
The 6th Flotilla, including Syren, mobilised and transferred to its war station at Dover (as part of the Dover Patrol) on 31 July–1 August 1914. The Flotilla's role was to prevent German warships from passing into the English Channel. Syren took part in the landing of a force of Royal Marines at Ostend on 27 August 1914. On 28 October 1914, Syren was on anti-submarine patrol off Westende in Belgium with Falcon when the two ships came under fire from the shore. Falcon was hit, killing 8 and wounding 15 of her crew.

On 24 February 1915 Syren went to the assistance of the steamship SS Harpalion, which had been torpedoed by the German submarine U-8 near Beachy Head, hunting the submarine and rescuing Harpalion's crew which she took into Newhaven. On 4 March 1915, the German submarine U-8 became caught in nets laid across the Straits of Dover to indicate the passage of submarines, and the disturbance in the net was spotted by the drifter Roburn and the destroyer Amazon. Destroyers patrolling locally were ordered to hunt for the submarine, while duty submarines at Dover, including Syren, were ordered out to join the hunt. The destroyer Viking detonated her explosive anti-submarine sweep without effect, but after the submarine was spotted by Maori, Ghurka used her own explosive sweep to force the German submarine to the surface. The submarine was then shelled by the assembled destroyers, and was quickly scuttled and abandoned.

On 1 August 1916 Syren sighted a German submarine passing Dover. She opened fire on the submarine and dropped depth charges, but with no effect. Syren remained part of the Dover Patrol until the end of the war, leaving on 24 November 1918. The ship was sold for scrap to Hayes of Porthcawl on 14 September 1920.

== Pennant numbers ==
Pennant number	From	To
P72	1914	Sep 1915
D93	Sep 1915	Jan 1918
D85	Jan 1918	-
