= HMS Myrmidon (1900) =

Myrmidon-class destroyer of the Royal Navy

History

United Kingdom
- Name: HMS Myrmidon
- Namesake: Myrmidons
- Builder: Palmers, Jarrow
- Launched: 26 May 1900
- Fate: Lost after collision, 26 March 1917

General characteristics
- Class & type: Myrmidon-class destroyer
- Displacement: 350 long tons (356 t)
- Length: 210 ft (64 m)
- Propulsion: 2 × Triple expansion steam engines; 4 × Coal-fired Reed water tube boilers; 6,200 hp (4,623 kW)
- Speed: 30 knots (56 km/h; 35 mph)
- Complement: 63
- Armament: 1 × QF 12-pounder gun; 2 × 18 inch (450 mm) torpedo tubes

HMS Myrmidon was one of two Myrmidon-class destroyers which served with the Royal Navy.

== Design and construction ==
In April 1899, the British Admiralty placed an order with the Jarrow shipbuilder Palmers Shipbuilding and Iron Company Limited for three torpedo boat destroyers, Peterel (which had been laid down "on-spec", in advance of a formal order), Myrmidon and Syren, for the Royal Navy under a supplement to the 1899–1900 shipbuilding programme, (Note: In total this supplement to the programme authorised the purchase of four battleships, four cruisers and twelve destroyers.) with a contract price being £47149 per ship. Myrmidon was laid down (as Yard number 751) on 23 October 1899, and was launched on 26 May 1900, completing in May 1901. She was the fifth ship of that name to serve with the Royal Navy.

Myrmidon closely resembled Spiteful, built by Palmers under the previous year's shipbuilding programme, and like Spiteful had four funnels. She was 219 feet 6 inches (66.90 m) long overall, with a beam of 20 feet 9 inches (6.32 m) and a draught of 8 feet 11 inches (2.72 m). Displacement was 370 long tons (380 t) light and 420 long tons (430 t) full load. Four Reed boilers fed steam at 250 pounds per square inch (1,700 kPa) to triple expansion steam engines rated at 6,200 indicated horsepower (4,600 kW) and driving two propeller shafts, giving a speed of 30 knots (56 km/h; 35 mph). 91 tons of coal were carried.

Armament was a single QF 12 pounder 12 cwt (3 in-calibre or 76 mm) gun on a platform on the ship's conning tower (in practice the platform was also used as the ship's bridge), backed up by five 6-pounder guns, and two 18 inch (450 mm) torpedo tubes.

== Service history ==
Myrmidon was commissioned in August 1901 to serve on the Mediterranean Station. Commander Cecil Lambert was appointed in command in January 1902, and in September that year she was part of a squadron visiting Nauplia and Souda Bay off Crete for combined manoeuvres of the Mediterranean and Channel Fleets, during which she was declared as being sunk by the umpires of the exercise when she engaged two destroyers of an opposing fleet, mistaking them for torpedo boats. In February 1903 she again left Malta for Platanias and Greek waters, accompanied by HMS Illustrious, HMS London and HMS Caesar. Myrmidon returned from the Mediterranean in 1905 and then served with the Atlantic Fleet for a year.

In September 1907, Myrmidon, based at Portsmouth as part of the First Destroyer Flotilla of the Channel Fleet, started a refit at Sheerness dockyard, with her boilers being retubed and her hull and machinery refurbished, with the refit completing in April 1908. Mrymidon was a member of the Fourth Destroyer Flotilla, based at Portsmouth, in 1910 and remained part of that Flotilla in 1912. On 30 August 1912, the Admiralty directed all destroyers were to be grouped into classes designated by letters based on contract speed and appearance. As a four-funneled 30-knotter destroyer, Myrmidon was assigned to the B Class. In 1912, older destroyers were organised into Patrol Flotillas, with Myrmidon being part of the 6th Flotilla, based at Portsmouth, in March 1913. She remained part of the 6th Flotilla in July 1914, on the eve of the outbreak of the First World War.

=== First World War ===
The 6th Flotilla mobilised and transferred to its war station at Dover (as part of the Dover Patrol) on 31 July–1 August 1914. The Flotilla's role was to prevent German warships from passing into the English Channel. Myrmidon was operating off the Belgian coast on 24 October 1914 when she reported being attacked by a submarine.

Myrmidon remained part of the 6th Flotilla at the beginning of March 1917. Myrmidon sank after a collision with the merchant ship Hamborn on 26 March 1917 off Dungeness. Her crew were rescued by HMS Mermaid and SS Tambour, with the loss of one life.

== Pennant numbers ==
Pennant number	Date
P83	1914
D85	Sep 1915

== Bibliography ==
- Brassey, T.A. (1902). The Naval Annual 1902. Portsmouth, UK: J. Griffin and Co.
- Brassey, T.A. (1903). The Naval Annual 1903. Portsmouth, UK: J. Griffin and Co.
- Chesneau, Roger & Kolesnik, Eugene M., eds. (1979). Conway's All The World's Fighting Ships 1860–1905. London: Conway Maritime Press. ISBN 0-85177-133-5.
- Colledge, J. J.; Warlow, Ben (2006) [1969]. Ships of the Royal Navy: The Complete Record of All Fighting Ships of the Royal Navy from the 15th Century to the Present (3rd Rev ed.). London: Chatham Publishing. ISBN 978-1-86176-281-8. OCLC 67375475.
- Corbett, Julian S. (1920). Naval Operations: Vol. I: To the Battle of the Falklands December 1914. History of the Great War. London: Longman's Green & Co.
- Dittmar, F.J.; Colledge, J.J. (1972). British Warships 1914–1919. Shepperton, UK: Ian Allan. ISBN 0-7110-0380-7.
- Friedman, Norman (2009). British Destroyers: From Earliest Days to the Second World War. Barnsley, UK: Seaforth Publishing. ISBN 978-1-84832-049-9.
- Gardiner, Robert & Gray, Randal, eds. (1985). Conway's All The World's Fighting Ships 1906–1921. London: Conway Maritime Press. ISBN 0-85177-245-5.
- Hepper, David (2006). British Warship Losses of the Ironclad Era, 1860–1919. London: Chatham Publishing. ISBN 9781861762733.
- Lyon, David (2001) [1996]. The First Destroyers. London: Caxton Editions. ISBN 1-84067-3648.
- Manning, T. D. (1961). The British Destroyer. London: Putnam & Co. OCLC 6470051.
- March, Edgar J. (1966). British Destroyers: A History of Development, 1892–1953; Drawn by Admiralty Permission From Official Records & Returns, Ships' Covers & Building Plans. London: Seeley Service. OCLC 164893555.
- Monograph No. 7: The Patrol Flotillas at the Outbreak of the War (PDF). Naval Staff Monographs (Historical). Vol. III. Naval Staff, Training and Staff Duties Division. 1921. pp. 71–107.
- Monograph No. 24: Home Waters: Part II.: September and October 1914 (PDF). Naval Staff Monographs (Historical). Vol. XI. Naval Staff, Training and Staff Duties Division. 1924.
