= HMS Peterel (1927) =

Gunboat of the Royal Navy

Coordinates: 31°14′16.9″N 121°29′10.1″E

History

United Kingdom
- Name: HMS Peterel
- Builder: Yarrow Shipbuilders
- Launched: 18 July 1927
- Fate: Sunk in combat, 8 December 1941, Shanghai

General characteristics
- Type: River gunboat
- Displacement: 310 tons
- Length: 177 ft (53.9 m)
- Beam: 29 ft (8.8 m)
- Draught: 3.2 ft (1.0 m)
- Propulsion: Yarrow boilers, steam turbine 2,250 hp
- Speed: 16 knots
- Complement: 55
- Armament: 2×3-inch (76 mm) guns, 8×machine guns

HMS Peterel was a river gunboat built by Yarrow Shipbuilders at Scotstoun and she was the sixth ship of the Royal Navy to carry the name and the lead ship of her class. Her name used an archaic spelling for consistency with previous Royal Navy Ships of the same name, in contrast to the modern accepted spelling petrel (as in the bird).

After completion, she was dismantled and shipped to Hong Kong for re-assembly before being deployed for service on the China station, on the Yangtze River to provide protection for British commerce and nationals. HMS Peterel was designed and equipped to patrol the upper reaches of the river (she had a shallow draft and her primary armament was a pair of 3-inch guns).

== Inter-war years ==
HMS Peterel's service on the China station was largely uneventful. She lost crew members in isolated accidents (for example, Stoker First Class William J Lansdell died from drowning on 25 November 1928 and Stoker First Class Wilfred O'Brien from drowning on 13 August 1930). The most notable event was that in 1930 she needed assistance by the French gunboat Doudart de Lagrée (Ernest Doudart de Lagrée) after running aground in the Yangtze.

== World War II ==
=== Outbreak of war ===
At the outbreak of war in Europe in 1939, many ships and personnel from the Royal Navy's China Squadron were recalled to home waters, or sent to the Mediterranean. A number of river gunboats were considered of limited value and these were laid up locally. One river gunboat, HMS Peterel, was retained in Shanghai to provide a token British military presence that it was hoped would dissuade the Japanese (who had already occupied most of the city) from moving against the International Settlement there. Her crew was reduced to 21 and 19 locally recruited Chinese; she was moored in the pool of Shanghai (off the French Concession). With her reduced complement, she was capable of steaming for only a limited period of time and her main armament had been disabled to lessen her value to the Japanese in the event of capture. Her captain, 62-year-old Temporary Lieutenant Stephen Polkinghorn from New Zealand, was under orders to scuttle the vessel should the Japanese attack.

=== Sinking ===
By December 1941 Shanghai (aside from the International Settlement and French Concession), had been occupied by Japan's land forces and there was a large buildup of Japanese naval forces in the area. At around 4:20am local time on 8 December 1941 news of the attack on Pearl Harbor, a few hours earlier, began filtering through to Shanghai. HMS Peterel was notified of the attack by Commander Kennedy from the British Consulate and the ship was called to battle stations.

Soon after the news of the attack on Pearl Harbor reached Shanghai, Japanese marines boarded the US Navy river gunboat, USS Wake. She was captured without a shot being fired (Wake was the only U.S. Navy vessel to have been captured by the enemy intact during World War II). The Japanese later commissioned her into their navy as the Tatara and subsequently gave her to its puppet Reorganized National Government of China based in Nanjing.

Although Japan had not declared war on Great Britain, Japanese marines also boarded the Peterel to demand her surrender. Polkinghorn attempted to stall for time, in order for the demolition fuses to be lit and the code books to be passed down a special chute to be burned in the boiler room. When his attempts failed, Polkinghorn told them to "Get off my bloody ship!" The Japanese disembarked and almost immediately the Japanese cruiser Izumo, the accompanying gunboat Toba and Japanese shore batteries in the French Concession opened fire at almost point-blank range. Despite being outnumbered and hopelessly outgunned, the Royal Navy crew of HMS Peterel returned fire, using small arms and the deck-mounted Lewis machine guns (the breechblocks from her 3-inch guns having been removed and taken to the Royal Navy dockyard in Hong Kong). The Royal Navy crew inflicted several casualties on the Japanese before the Peterel capsized and drifted from its mooring under heavy fire. The Japanese machine gunned both the surviving Royal Navy and locally recruited Chinese crewmen in the water.

Of the British crew of 22, 18 were on board the Peterel at the time of the attack. Six of them were killed by the Japanese; they have no known graves and it is unclear whether their bodies were recovered from the water. 12 Royal Navy crew survived: some sought refuge on a neutral Panamanian-registered merchant vessel, the SS Marizion. In violation of international law, the Japanese boarded the ship and took the survivors prisoner. The number of casualties suffered by the locally recruited non-combatant Chinese crew and the fate of any survivors at the hands of the Japanese is unknown (under a directive ratified on 5 August 1937 by Emperor Hirohito, the Japanese removed the constraints of international law on the treatment of Chinese prisoners by its military).

The Royal Navy survivors from HMS Peterel (including Polkinghorn) were moved amongst the Hongchew, Kiang Wang and Woosung internment camps in China. Ongoing supplies received from the British Residents Association (Shanghai) and the International Red Cross were critical to the survival of those interned. On 9 May 1945 the inmates at Kiang Wang were moved to camps in Japan itself.

Three of the crew of HMS Peterel were onshore during the Japanese attack; two were captured but the third, PO Telegraphist James Cuming, remained at large in Shanghai for the duration of the war, working for a Sino-American spy ring. The Lonely Battle, an account of Cuming's tale, was written by Desmond Wettern in 1960.

== Aftermath ==
Polkinghorn survived his three years and nine months in captivity. He was awarded a gallantry medal, the Distinguished Service Cross (DSC), for his actions in Shanghai. The citation (published in The London Gazette on 23 October 1945) reads: "For great courage, determination and tenacity in fighting his ship, HMS Peterel, when attacked by overwhelming Japanese forces at Shanghai on 8th December 1941".

A small collection of photographs displayed at the Bund Historical Museum in Shanghai records the scene in the pool of Shanghai in the days both before and after 8 December 1941. Included in the collection are images of the badly damaged, capsized hulk of HMS Peterel.

In December 2013 HMS Daring (a Royal Navy Type 45 destroyer) visited Shanghai and its crew participated in a HMS Peterel commemoration service.

A fictionalised account of the Peterel's sinking appears in JG Ballard's novel Empire of the Sun, which was adapted into a film released in 1987. This scene was deleted from the final film.
