= Brian Barttelot =

Royal Navy Admiral; Admiral Superintendent of Malta Dockyard (1867–1942)

Admiral Sir Brian Barttelot KBE CB CVO
- Born: 13 December 1867
- Died: 4 February 1942 (aged 74)
- Military career
- Allegiance: United Kingdom
- Branch: Royal Navy
- Rank: Admiral
- Commands: HMS Niobe; HMS Leviathan; HMS Blenheim; Chatham Gunnery School; HMS Monmouth; HMS Resolution; Malta Dockyard
- Conflicts: World War I
- Awards: Knight Commander of the Order of the British Empire; Companion of the Order of the Bath; Commander of the Royal Victorian Order

Admiral Sir Brian Herbert Fairbairn Barttelot, KBE, CB, CVO (13 December 1867 – 4 February 1942) was a Royal Navy officer who became Admiral Superintendent of Malta Dockyard.

== Naval career ==
Barttelot joined the Royal Navy, and was promoted to lieutenant on 14 April 1889, and to commander on 30 June 1901. He was appointed in command of the destroyer HMS Bullfinch on 24 February 1902, and commanded her as part of the Portsmouth instructional flotilla. On 1 August 1902, he transferred to the destroyer HMS Flirt.

Promoted to captain on 31 December 1906, Barttelot became commanding officer of the cruiser HMS Niobe in January 1908, commanding officer of the cruiser HMS Leviathan in March 1908 and commanding officer of the cruiser HMS Blenheim in January 1909. He went on to be Captain of the Chatham Gunnery School in March 1910, commanding officer of the cruiser HMS Monmouth in April 1912 and commanding officer of the battleship HMS Resolution in November 1917 during the First World War.

Promoted to rear admiral on 26 August 1918, he became Admiral Superintendent of Malta Dockyard in October 1918. He was promoted to vice admiral on 1 November 1923. He was Director of Dockyards Department from March 1923 to March 1928 during which time he was promoted to full admiral on 1 August 1927.

He was appointed a Knight Commander of the Order of the British Empire (KBE) in the 1927 Birthday Honours.

Military offices
Preceded by George Ballard	Admiral Superintendent, Malta Dockyard; 1918–1921	Succeeded by John Luce
