= Brazilian coastal defense ship Deodoro =

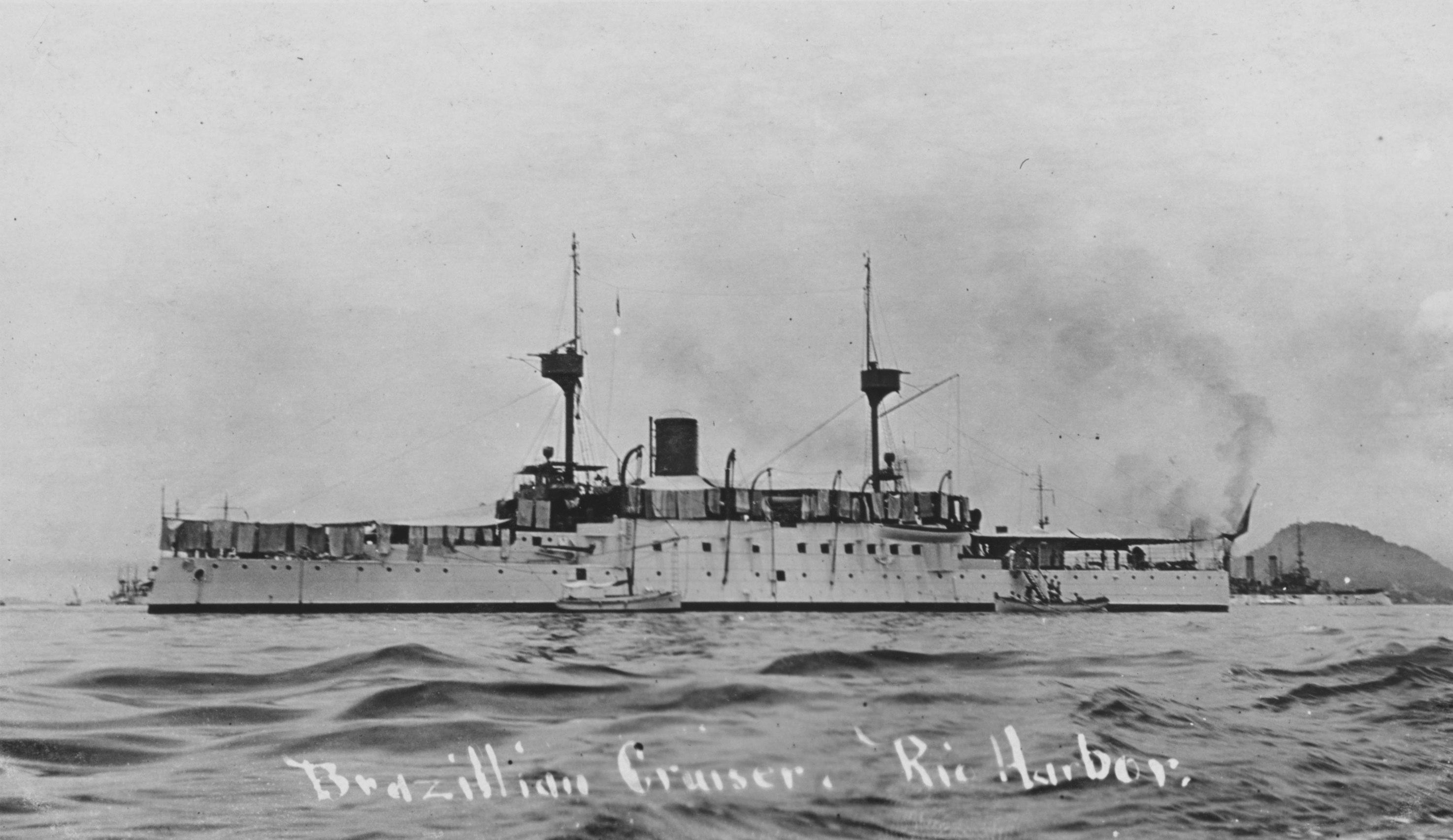
- Deodoro during the Rio de Janeiro visit of the US Great White Fleet in 1908

History

Brazil
- Name: Marshal Deodoro
- Namesake: Deodoro da Fonseca
- Ordered: 1890s
- Builder: Société Nouvelle des Forges et Chantiers de la Méditerranée, La Seyne, France
- Laid down: 1896
- Launched: 1898
- Completed: 1900
- Fate: Sold to Mexico, 1924

Mexico
- Name: Anáhuac
- Acquired: 19 April 1924
- Decommissioned: 1938
- Fate: Scrapped

General characteristics
- Type: Coastal defense ship
- Displacement: 3,162 tons standard
- Length: 267 feet 6 inches (81.5 m)
- Beam: 47 feet 3 inches (14.4 m)
- Draught: 13 feet 2 inches (4.0 m)
- Propulsion: 8 Lagrafel d'Allest boilers; Vertical triple expansion engines; 3,400 ihp (2,500 kW); Coal-fired, capacity 236 tonnes (232 long tons; 260 short tons)
- Speed: 15.5 knots (29 km/h; 18 mph) maximum
- Complement: 200
- Armament: 2 × Armstrong 9.2-inch (230 mm) guns in 2 single turrets; 4 × 4.7-inch (120 mm) guns; 2 × 6-inch (150 mm) howitzers; 4 × 6 pdr (57 mm (2.2 in)) Hotchkiss guns (Note: Lyon says the ship carried six of these guns, and does not list the 1-pounders.); 2 × 1 pdr (37 mm (1.5 in)) guns; 2 × 18-inch (457 mm) torpedo tubes
- Armour: Belt: 5 feet 6 inches (1.68 m) depth, 13.75 inches (349 mm) tapering to 4 inches (100 mm) thick; Deck: 1.3 inches (33 mm); Casemate: 2.9 in (74 mm); Turret face: 8.6 in (220 mm)

Deodoro, also known as Marshal Deodoro, was a coastal defense ship built for the Brazilian Navy at the end of the nineteenth century. It was the lead ship of its class, alongside Floriano. Deodoro was one of several ships that rebelled in the 1910 Revolt of the Lash, and it was used for neutrality patrols during the First World War. It was sold to Mexico in 1924, and broken up for scrap in 1938.

== Service ==
Deodoro (Note: The Brazilian Navy originally named the ship Ipiranga in January 1896, but changed it in December.) was laid down by the French shipbuilding company Société Nouvelle des Forges et Chantiers de la Méditerranée in 1896, supervised by Admiral José Cândido Guillobel. Its construction was temporarily suspended by the Brazilians while they modified its design. It was launched on 18 June 1898, after a ceremony that was attended by representatives from Brazil, the French Navy, and a Russian gunboat. Its christening was accomplished with an electric button, which sent a signal to cut a cord and let a bottle of champagne break on the ship. At the beginning of the Spanish–American War (1898), officials from both participants traveled to France to inspect the incomplete Deodoro and sister ship Floriano in view of purchasing them for the conflict. Neither was close enough to completion to make such an acquisition worthwhile.

Deodoro was completed in 1900, and its trials were successful, including a 24-hour trial with a mean speed of 14 knots (26 km/h; 16 mph). After the ship was handed over to Brazil, the ship left France en route for Brazil, stopping along the way in the Spanish Canary Islands. A nearby British warship, which was at that time engaged in the Second Boer War, suspected the ship of being a Boer-chartered privateer heading south to interfere with British merchant ships plying along the coast of southern Africa. Although the Brazilians were able to convince the British of their identity, they steamed with lights off for the next night or two in an effort to avoid further confusion with any other warships. Deodoro arrived in Brazil on 18 February 1900.

Deodoro saw its first action in 1904, when it shelled rebelling soldiers at the military school at Praia Vermelha. Six years later, its crew rebelled as part of the Revolt of the Lash. The Brazilian Navy at the time was heavily segregated between white officers and broadly black or mulatto enlisted sailors, and the former would often violently punish the latter for even minor transgressions. Tensions came to a head in November 1910, when sailors aboard the new dreadnought Minas Geraes rebelled, and the crews of Deodoro, another new dreadnought (São Paulo), a new cruiser (Bahia), and several smaller vessels joined. The revolt ended peacefully, and the mutineers were granted an amnesty that was later cancelled.

In 1912, the Brazilian Navy overhauled Deodoro in Rio de Janeiro, fitting a new propulsion system and armament. In September and October 1913, the ship took part in a major naval exercise with the majority of the Brazilian fleet, which was observed by the country's president, naval minister, and other politicians.

During the First World War, the navy placed Deodoro in its northern squadron, which was responsible for neutrality patrols in the area between the states of Amazonas (located up the Amazon River) and Sergipe. Deodoro, the detachment's flagship, was joined in this task by Floriano, two cruisers, two destroyers, and the six vessels of Brazil's Amazon River flotilla.

On 19 April 1924, Brazil sold the ship to the Mexican Navy, where it was renamed Anáhuac. The Brazilians used the money gained (eight thousand contos) to purchase a submarine from Italy, Humaytá. No further upgrades were made to Anáhuac in its remaining service life, and the Mexican Navy sold it for scrap in 1938.

== See also ==
- List of historical ships of the Brazilian Navy

== Bibliography ==
- Brassey, TA, ed. The Naval Annual, 1897. Portsmouth: J Griffin and Company, 1897. OCLC 5973345.
- Brassey, TA, ed. The Naval Annual, 1900. Portsmouth: J Griffin and Company, 1900. OCLC 5973345.
- "Deodoro." Serviço de Documentação da Marinha — Histórico de Navios. Diretoria do Patrimônio Histórico e Documentação da Marinha, Departamento de História Marítima. Accessed 19 August 2017.
- "Encouraçado Guarda-Costas Deodoro." Navios De Guerra Brasileiros. Accessed 28 August 2017.
- Gardiner, Robert; Chesneau, Roger, eds. (1980). Conway's All The World's Fighting Ships 1922–1946. London: Conway Maritime Press. ISBN 0-85177-146-7.
- Gardiner, Robert and Randal Gray, eds. Conway's All the World's Fighting Ships 1906–1921. Annapolis: Naval Institute Press, 1985. ISBN 0-87021-907-3. OCLC 12119866.
- Lyon, Hugh (1979). "Brazil". In Chesneau, Roger & Kolesnik, Eugene M. (eds.). Conway's All the World's Fighting Ships 1860–1905. London: Conway Maritime Press. ISBN 0-85177-133-5.
- Morgan, Zachary R. Legacy of the Lash: Race and Corporal Punishment in the Brazilian Navy and the Atlantic World. Bloomington: Indiana University Press, 2014. ISBN 0253014204. OCLC 952824891.
- "Notes and Queries of Service Afloat and Ashore," Navy & Army Illustrated 6, no. 76 (16 July 1898), 401.
- Scheina, Robert. Latin America: A Naval History, 1810–1987. Annapolis, MD: Naval Institute Press, 1987. ISBN 0-87021-295-8. OCLC 15696006.
- "The New Brazilian Armorclad 'Marshal Deodoro'," Scientific American 82, no. 12 (24 March 1900), 184. JSTOR 24981290
