= Cecil Lambert =

Royal Navy Admiral (1864–1928)

Admiral Sir Cecil Lambert KCB
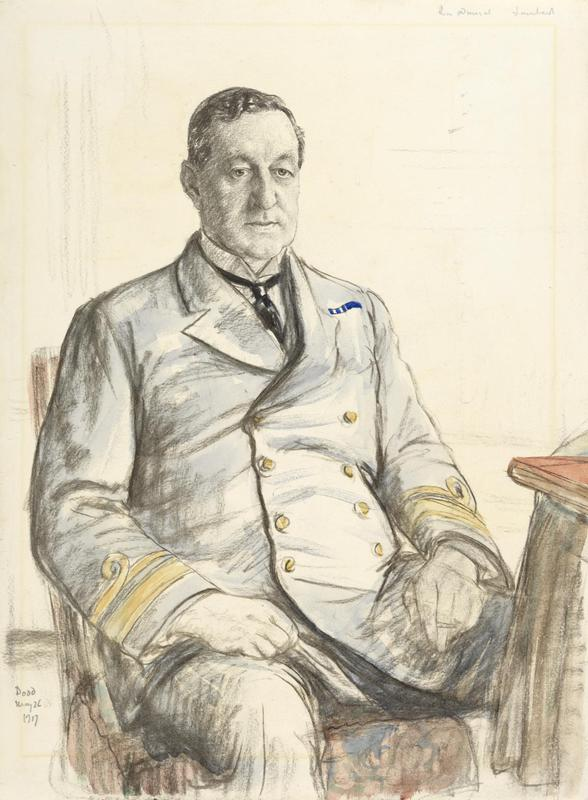
- Rear-admiral Cecil Foley Lambert by Francis Dodd
- Born: 28 May 1864
- Died: 29 February 1928 (aged 63)
- Military career
- Allegiance: United Kingdom
- Branch: Royal Navy; Royal Air Force
- Rank: Admiral
- Commands: HMS Lapwing; HMS Hibernia
- Conflicts: World War I
- Awards: Knight Commander of the Order of the Bath

Admiral Sir Cecil Foley Lambert KCB (28 May 1864 – 29 February 1928) was a Royal Navy admiral during World War I.

== Naval career ==
Born the son of Sir Henry Edward Francis Lambert, 6th Baronet, and his wife, Eliza Catherine Hervey, Cecil Lambert joined the Royal Navy as a Naval Cadet in 1877.

Promoted to commander on 31 December 1900, he was appointed in command of HMS Panther in early December 1901, but moved to the destroyer HMS Myrmidon the following month. After promotion to captain in June 1905, he went on to command HMS Lapwing and HMS Hibernia.

He became commander of the destroyer flotillas in the First Fleet in July 1912 and Fourth Sea Lord and a Lord Commissioner of the Admiralty in 1913 and continued to serve in that role into World War I.

In 1917 he was appointed commodore, first class, in command of the 2nd Light Cruiser Squadron in the Grand Fleet, with his flag in HMS Birmingham, being promoted to the rank of Rear Admiral in April 1917. In the same year he was awarded the Japanese Order of the Rising Sun, Gold and Silver Star (the second highest of eight classes associated with the Order), notice of the King's permission to accept and wear this honour being duly published in the London Gazette.

From February – September 1918 he served as Rear-Admiral Commanding the Aegean Squadron.

In 1919 Lambert was seconded to the recently established Royal Air Force where he served as Director of Personnel. The following year he was appointed to the Air Council as an additional member. He relinquished his appointment on 5 December 1921 and was placed on the Retired List. He was promoted to full Admiral on the Retired List on 1 March 1926.

== Family ==
In 1896 Cecil Lambert married Rosina Drake, the daughter of Francis Drake of Brixham in Devon.

== Honours and awards ==
- Knight Commander of the Order of the Bath – 5 June 1920
- Order of the Rising Sun, 2nd Class (Japan) – 2 November 1917
- Grand Commander of the Order of the Redeemer (Greece) – 1918
- Chevalier of the Legion of Honour (France) – 1918

Military offices
Preceded by Sir William Pakenham	Fourth Sea Lord; 1913–1916	Succeeded by Sir Lionel Halsey
Vacant Title last held by W S Brancker; As Master-General of Personnel	RAF Director of Personnel; 1919–1920	Succeeded by J F A Higgins
