= Myrmidon-class destroyer =

Class overview
- Name: Myrmidon class
- Builders: Palmers, Jarrow
- Operators: Royal Navy
- Built: 1899–1900
- In commission: 1900–1920
- Completed: 2
- Lost: 1
- Scrapped: 1

General characteristics
- Type: Torpedo boat destroyer
- Displacement: 350 long tons (356 t)
- Length: 210 ft (64 m)
- Propulsion: Triple expansion steam engines; Coal-fired water-tube boilers; 6,200 hp (4,623 kW)
- Speed: 30 knots (56 km/h; 35 mph)
- Complement: 63
- Armament: 1 × QF 12-pounder gun; 2 × 18-inch (450 mm) torpedo tubes

The Myrmidon-class destroyer was a class of two destroyers that served with the Royal Navy. Myrmidon and Syren were built by Palmers Shipbuilding and Iron Company as part of the group of boats known as the 'thirty knotters'.

Concern about the higher speeds of foreign boats had prompted the Admiralty to order new destroyers capable of 30 knots (56 km/h; 35 mph), rather than the 27-knot (50 km/h; 31 mph) requirement which had been standard. The boats were not able to make this speed in bad weather, where they were usually wet and uncomfortable with cramped crew quarters, but they proved their toughness in serving in the Great War, despite being twenty years old. Thanks to their watertight bulkheads, their thin plating and light structure was able to take a great deal of damage and remain afloat, although their plates buckled easily affecting their handling. Myrmidon was sunk after a collision in 1917, while Syren served through the war and was broken up after the end of hostilities.

The ships were fitted with Reed boilers which generated around 6,200 horsepower (4,600 kW). They were armed with the standard 12-pounder gun and two torpedo tubes and carried a complement of 63 officers and men. Ships of this type bore four funnels and were designated B-class destroyers after a reorganisation in 1913. These particular ships had a special form of funnel cap fitted which was designed to prevent sea water entering the space between the funnel uptake and outer casing.

== Ships ==
- HMS Myrmidon, launched 26 May 1900, rammed and sunk by SS Hambourn in the English Channel, 26 March 1917.
- HMS Syren, launched 20 December 1900, sold for breaking up 14 September 1920.

== Bibliography ==
- Brassey, T. A., ed. (1902). The Naval Annual 1902. Portsmouth, UK: J Griffin and Co.
- Chesneau, Roger & Kolesnik, Eugene M., eds. (1979). Conway's All The World's Fighting Ships 1860–1905. London: Conway Maritime Press. ISBN 0-85177-133-5.
- Colledge, J. J.; Warlow, Ben (2006) [1969]. Ships of the Royal Navy: The Complete Record of All Fighting Ships of the Royal Navy from the 15th Century to the Present (3rd Rev ed.). London: Chatham Publishing. ISBN 978-1-86176-281-8. OCLC 67375475.
- Dittmar, F.J.; Colledge, J.J. (1972). British Warships 1914–1919. Shepperton, UK: Ian Allan. ISBN 0-7110-0380-7.
- Friedman, Norman (2009). British Destroyers: From Earliest Days to the Second World War. Barnsley, UK: Seaforth Publishing. ISBN 978-1-84832-049-9.
- Gardiner, Robert & Gray, Randal, eds. (1985). Conway's All The World's Fighting Ships 1906–1921. London: Conway Maritime Press. ISBN 0-85177-245-5.
- Lyon, David (2001) [1996]. The First Destroyers. London: Caxton Editions. ISBN 1-84067-3648.
- Manning, T. D. (1961). The British Destroyer. London: Putnam & Co. OCLC 6470051.
- March, Edgar J. (1966). British Destroyers: A History of Development, 1892–1953; Drawn by Admiralty Permission From Official Records & Returns, Ships' Covers & Building Plans. London: Seeley Service. OCLC 164893555.
