= Bullfinch-class destroyer =

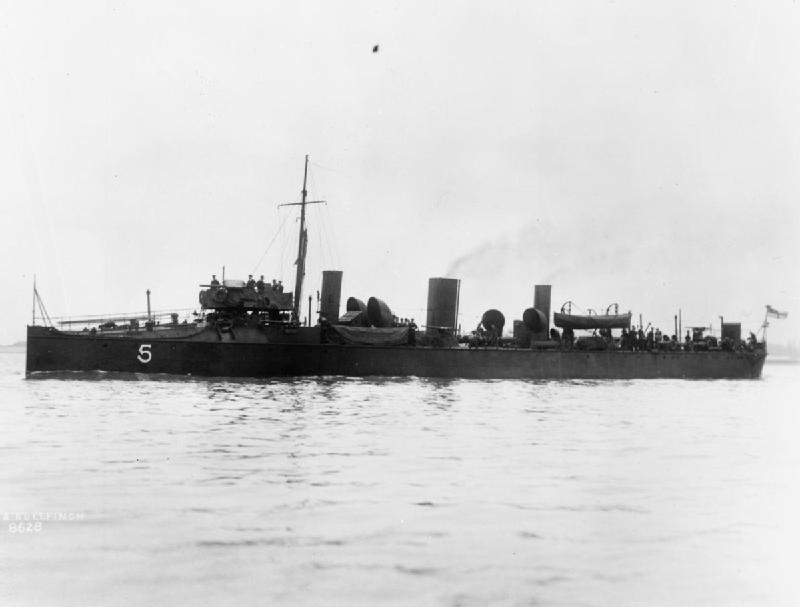
- HMS Bullfinch

Class overview
- Builders: Earle's Shipbuilding, Hull
- Operators: Royal Navy
- Built: 1898
- In commission: 1898–1920
- Completed: 2
- Retired: 2

General characteristics
- Type: C-class destroyer
- Displacement: 345 long tons (351 t)
- Length: 210 ft (64 m)
- Propulsion: Thornycroft boilers, 5,800 hp (4,325 kW)
- Speed: 30 knots (56 km/h; 35 mph)
- Complement: 63
- Armament: 1 × 12-pounder gun; 2 × torpedo tubes

Two Bullfinch-class destroyers served with the British Royal Navy; Bullfinch and Dove were both built by Earle's Shipbuilding company in Hull in 1898. They were 345-ton class C-class destroyers, sporting three funnels, and capable of a speed of 30 knots (56 km/h), thanks to their Thornycroft boilers. They were 210 feet long, generated 5,800 HP and carried a full complement of 63 officers and men. They were distinguished from other similar C-class ships by their flat-sided centre funnels and conspicuous steam pipes. They were armed with the standard twelve-pounder and two torpedo tubes, and served through the Great War, being broken up after the end of hostilities.

== See also ==
Media related to Bullfinch class destroyer at Wikimedia Commons
