= HMS Peterel (1838) =

Brig of the Royal Navy

History

United Kingdom
- Name: Peterel
- Ordered: 14 April 1836
- Builder: Pembroke Dockyard
- Laid down: April 1837
- Launched: 25 May 1838
- Completed: 18 August 1838
- Commissioned: 3 October 1838
- Fate: Sold for scrap, 11 January 1862

General characteristics
- Class & type: Alert-class brig
- Tons burthen: 359 4/94 bm
- Length: 95 ft 1 in (29.0 m) (Gun deck); 75 ft (22.9 m) (Keel)
- Beam: 30 ft 3 in (9.2 m)
- Draught: 10 ft 11 in (3.3 m)
- Depth: 14 ft 9 in (4.5 m)
- Complement: 44
- Armament: 2 × 6-pdr cannon; 4 × 12-pdr carronades

HMS Peterel was a six-gun Alert-class packet brig built for the Royal Navy during the 1830s.

== Description ==
Peterel had a length at the gundeck of 95 feet 1 inch (29.0 m) and 75 feet (22.9 m) at the keel. She had a beam of 30 feet 3 inches (9.2 m), a draught of 10 feet 11 inches (3.3 m) and a depth of hold of 14 feet 9 inches (4.5 m). The ship's tonnage was 359 4/94 tons burthen. The Alert class was initially armed with a pair of 6-pounder cannon and four 12-pounder carronades. Later they were equipped with six 32-pounder or eight 18-pounder cannon. The ships had a crew of 44 officers and ratings.

== Construction and career ==
Peterel, the third ship of her name to serve in the Royal Navy, was ordered on 14 April 1836, laid down in April 1837 at Pembroke Dockyard, Wales, and launched on 23 May 1838. She was completed on 3 October 1838 at Plymouth Dockyard and commissioned on 18 August of that year.
