= Spiteful-class destroyer =

Class overview
- Name: Spiteful class
- Builders: Palmers Shipbuilding and Iron Company Limited, Jarrow
- Operators: Royal Navy
- Built: 1898–1899
- In commission: 1899–1920
- Completed: 2
- Scrapped: 2

General characteristics
- Type: Torpedo boat destroyer
- Displacement: 350 long tons (356 t)
- Length: 210 ft (64 m)
- Propulsion: 2 × Triple expansion steam engines; 4 × Coal-fired Reed boilers; 6,300 hp (4,698 kW)
- Speed: 30 knots (56 km/h; 35 mph)
- Complement: 63
- Armament: 1 × QF 12-pounder gun; 2 × 18-inch (450 mm) torpedo tubes

Two Spiteful-class destroyers served with the Royal Navy. These ships were both built by Palmers Shipbuilding and Iron Company Limited at Jarrow, and were part of the group of boats known as the 'thirty knotters'.

Concern about the higher speeds of foreign boats had prompted the Admiralty to order new destroyers capable of 30 knots (56 km/h; 35 mph), rather than the 27-knot (50 km/h; 31 mph) requirement which had been standard. The boats were not able to make this speed in bad weather, where they were usually wet and uncomfortable with cramped crew quarters. However, they proved their toughness while serving through the Great War, despite being twenty years old. Thanks to their watertight bulkheads, their thin plating and light structure was able to take a great deal of damage and remain afloat; although their plates were easily damaged by rough handling or heavy weather.

The ships were fitted with Reed water tube boilers that generated around 6,300 horsepower (4,700 kW). Both were originally fired using coal, but in 1904 Spiteful was converted to burn fuel oil. They were armed with the standard 12-pounder gun and two torpedo tubes and carried a complement of 63 officers and men. The two ships of this type bore four funnels and were designated B-class destroyers in 1913. They were sold off after the end of hostilities.

== Ships ==
- Spiteful, launched 11 January 1899, sold for breaking up 14 September 1920.
- Peterel, launched 30 March 1899, sold for breaking up 30 August 1919.

== Bibliography ==
- Chesneau, Roger & Kolesnik, Eugene M., eds. (1979). Conway's All The World's Fighting Ships 1860–1905. London: Conway Maritime Press. ISBN 0-85177-133-5.
- Colledge, J. J.; Warlow, Ben (2006) [1969]. Ships of the Royal Navy: The Complete Record of All Fighting Ships of the Royal Navy from the 15th Century to the Present (3rd Rev ed.). London: Chatham Publishing. ISBN 978-1-86176-281-8. OCLC 67375475.
- Dittmar, F.J.; Colledge, J.J. (1972). British Warships 1914–1919. Shepperton, UK: Ian Allan. ISBN 0-7110-0380-7.
- Friedman, Norman (2009). British Destroyers: From Earliest Days to the Second World War. Barnsley, UK: Seaforth Publishing. ISBN 978-1-84832-049-9.
- Gardiner, Robert & Gray, Randal, eds. (1985). Conway's All The World's Fighting Ships 1906–1921. London: Conway Maritime Press. ISBN 0-85177-245-5.
- Lyon, David (2001) [1996]. The First Destroyers. London: Caxton Editions. ISBN 1-84067-3648.
- Manning, T. D. (1961). The British Destroyer. London: Putnam & Co. OCLC 6470051.
- March, Edgar J. (1966). British Destroyers: A History of Development, 1892–1953; Drawn by Admiralty Permission From Official Records & Returns, Ships' Covers & Building Plans. London: Seeley Service. OCLC 164893555.
