= HMS Dove (1898) =

Destroyer of the Royal Navy

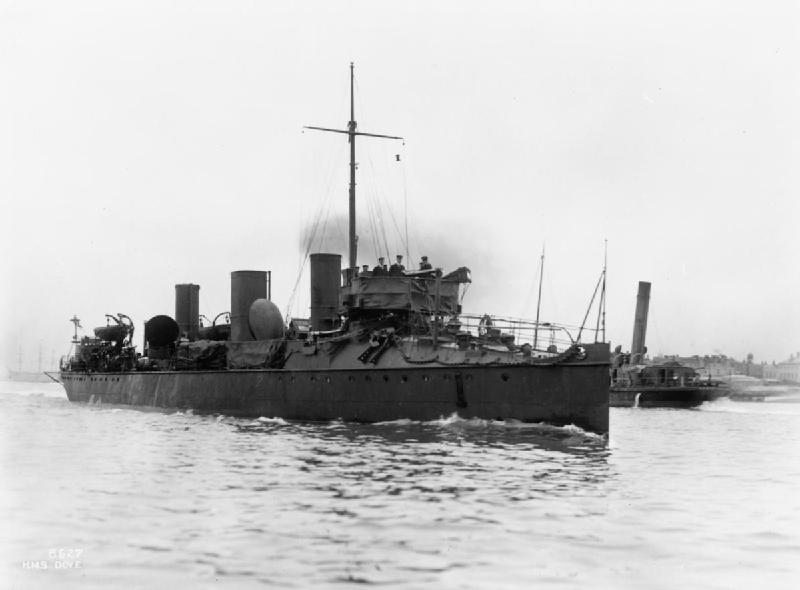
- HMS Dove

History

United Kingdom
- Name: HMS Dove
- Ordered: 1896 – 1897 Naval Estimates
- Builder: Earl's Shipbuilding and Engineering Company Limited, Hull, Yorkshire
- Laid down: 17 September 1896
- Launched: 21 March 1898
- Commissioned: July 1901
- Out of service: Laid up in reserve 1919
- Fate: Sold for breaking, 27 January 1920

General characteristics
- Class & type: Three-funnel, 30-knot destroyer
- Displacement: 345 long tons (351 t) standard; 390 long tons (396 t) full load
- Length: 214 ft 6 in (65.38 m) o/a
- Beam: 20 ft 6 in (6.25 m)
- Draught: 7 ft 10 in (2.39 m)
- Installed power: 5,900 ihp (4,400 kW)
- Propulsion: 4 × Thornycroft water tube boilers; 2 × vertical triple-expansion steam engines; 2 shafts
- Speed: 29 kn (54 km/h)
- Range: 80 tons coal; 1,490 nmi (2,760 km) at 11 kn (20 km/h; 13 mph)
- Complement: 60 officers and men
- Armament: 1 × QF 12-pounder 12 cwt Mark I gun; 5 × 6-pounder guns; 2 × single tubes for 18-inch (450mm) torpedoes

Service record
- Operations: World War I 1914 - 1918

HMS Dove was a three funnel, 30 knot destroyer ordered by the Royal Navy under the 1896–1897 Naval Estimates. She was the ninth ship to carry the name.

== Construction ==
HMS Dove was one of two "thirty-knotter" torpedo boat destroyers ordered by the British Admiralty from the Kingston upon Hull shipyard of Earle's Shipbuilding and Engineering Company as part of the 1896–1897 shipbuilding programme for the Royal Navy, out of a total of 20 destroyers ordered from various builders as part of this programme, consisting of 17 "thirty-knotters" contracted to reach a speed of 30 knots (56 km/h; 35 mph) during sea trials and three builders specials contracted to give higher speeds. As with other early Royal Navy destroyers, the design of Dove was left to the builder, with the Admiralty laying down only broad requirements (although all designs were approved by the Admiralty), rather than the Admiralty ordering ships to a standard design.

Dove was 214 feet 6 inches (65.38 m) long overall and 210 feet (64.01 m) between perpendiculars, with a beam of 20 feet 6 inches (6.25 m) and a draught of 7 feet 10 inches (2.39 m). Displacement was 345 long tons (351 t) light and 390 long tons (400 t) deep load. Four Thornycroft boilers fed steam at 220–250 pounds per square inch (1,500–1,700 kPa) to 2 four-cylinder triple-expansion steam engines rated at 5,800 indicated horsepower (4,300 kW). The boilers' outtakes were routed to three flat-sided funnels. Up to 80 long tons (81 t) of coal could be carried, giving a range of 1,490 nautical miles (2,760 km) at 11 knots (20 km/h; 13 mph). The ship had the standard armament of the Thirty-Knotters, i.e. a QF 12 pounder 12 cwt (3 in (76 mm) calibre) gun on a platform on the ship's conning tower (in practice the platform was also used as the ship's bridge), with a secondary armament of five 6-pounder guns, and two 18-inch (450 mm) torpedo tubes. The ship was manned by 63 officers and men.

The ship was laid down on 17 September 1896, at Earle's Shipbuilding and Engineering Company Limited shipyard at Hull, Yorkshire, Construction was delayed by industrial action and Dove was not launched until 21 March 1898. Although she was claimed to have reached 30.25 knots (56.02 km/h; 34.81 mph) during builder's tests, official trials were less successful, and like her sister ship Bullfinch, she failed to reach contract speed, Dove only reaching 29.25 knots (54.17 km/h; 33.66 mph). Problems with getting these destroyers through their acceptance trials resulted in financial problems for Earle's which resulted in the company's bankruptcy. Dove was completed and accepted by the Royal Navy in July 1901.

== Service history ==
=== Pre-War ===
After commissioning Dove was assigned to the Channel Fleet, taking part in the 1901 Naval Manoeuvres. Commander Douglas Nicholson was appointed in command on 24 February 1902, and Dove was assigned to the Portsmouth instructional flotilla. In May 1902 the ship struck a rock off Kildorney, and had to be towed by her sister ship Bullfinch to Queenstown. She was deemed fit for sea, and the following day was towed by the service vessel Seahorse to her home-port Portsmouth, where she was docked for repairs. In 1910, Dove formed part of the 5th Destroyer Flotilla at Devonport.

On 30 August 1912 the Admiralty directed all destroyers were to be grouped into classes designated by letters based on contract speed and appearance. As a three-funneled destroyer with a contract speed of 30 knots, Dove was assigned to the C class. The class letters were painted on the hull below the bridge area and on a funnel. In 1912, it was decided to allocate older destroyers to dedicated Patrol Flotillas, with Dove being allocated to the Seventh Flotilla, based at Devonport.

=== World War I ===
In July 1914 Dove was in active commission in the 7th Destroyer Flotilla based at Devonport tendered to the destroyer depot ship Leander. In November 1914 Dove was one of 29 destroyers transferred to Scapa Flow for local patrols around the base of the Grand Fleet. By March, Dove had transferred to the North Channel Patrol Flotilla, based at Larne in the north of Ireland.

On 24 April 1916, the Easter Rising against British rule broke out in Ireland. As a response, two Infantry Brigades were ordered from Liverpool to Dublin to reinforce the British forces, with Dove taking part in escorting the transports carrying these troops. By November 1918 she had been redeployed to the Devonport Local Flotilla based out of Liverpool.

In 1919 Dove was paid off and laid-up in reserve awaiting disposal. She was sold on 27 January 1920 to Maden and McKee of Porthcawl for breaking.

== Pennant numbers ==
Pennant number	From	To
D34	6 Dec 1914	1 Sep 1915
D51	1 Sep 1915	1 Jan 1918
D28	1 Jan 1918	27 Jan 1920

== Bibliography ==
- Brassey, T.A. (1902). The Naval Annual 1902. Portsmouth, UK: J. Griffin and Co.
- Chesneau, Roger & Kolesnik, Eugene M., eds. (1979). Conway's All The World's Fighting Ships 1860–1905. London: Conway Maritime Press. ISBN 0-85177-133-5.
- Colledge, J. J.; Warlow, Ben (2006) [1969]. Ships of the Royal Navy: The Complete Record of All Fighting Ships of the Royal Navy from the 15th Century to the Present (3rd Rev ed.). London: Chatham Publishing. ISBN 978-1-86176-281-8. OCLC 67375475.
- Dittmar, F. J. & Colledge, J. J. (1972). British Warships 1914–1919. Shepperton, UK: Ian Allan. ISBN 0-7110-0380-7.
- Friedman, Norman (2009). British Destroyers: From Earliest Days to the Second World War. Barnsley, UK: Seaforth Publishing. ISBN 978-1-84832-049-9.
- Gardiner, Robert & Gray, Randal, eds. (1985). Conway's All The World's Fighting Ships 1906–1921. London: Conway Maritime Press. ISBN 0-85177-245-5.
- Lyon, David (2001) [1996]. The First Destroyers. London: Caxton Editions. ISBN 1-84067-3648.
- Manning, T. D. (1961). The British Destroyer. London: Putnam & Co. OCLC 6470051.
- March, Edgar J. (1966). British Destroyers: A History of Development, 1892–1953; Drawn by Admiralty Permission From Official Records & Returns, Ships' Covers & Building Plans. London: Seeley Service. OCLC 164893555.
- Monograph No. 31: Home Waters—Part VI.: From October 1915 to May 1916 (PDF). Naval Staff Monographs (Historical). Vol. XV. The Naval Staff, Training and Staff Duties Division. 1926.
