= Deodoro-class coastal defense ship =

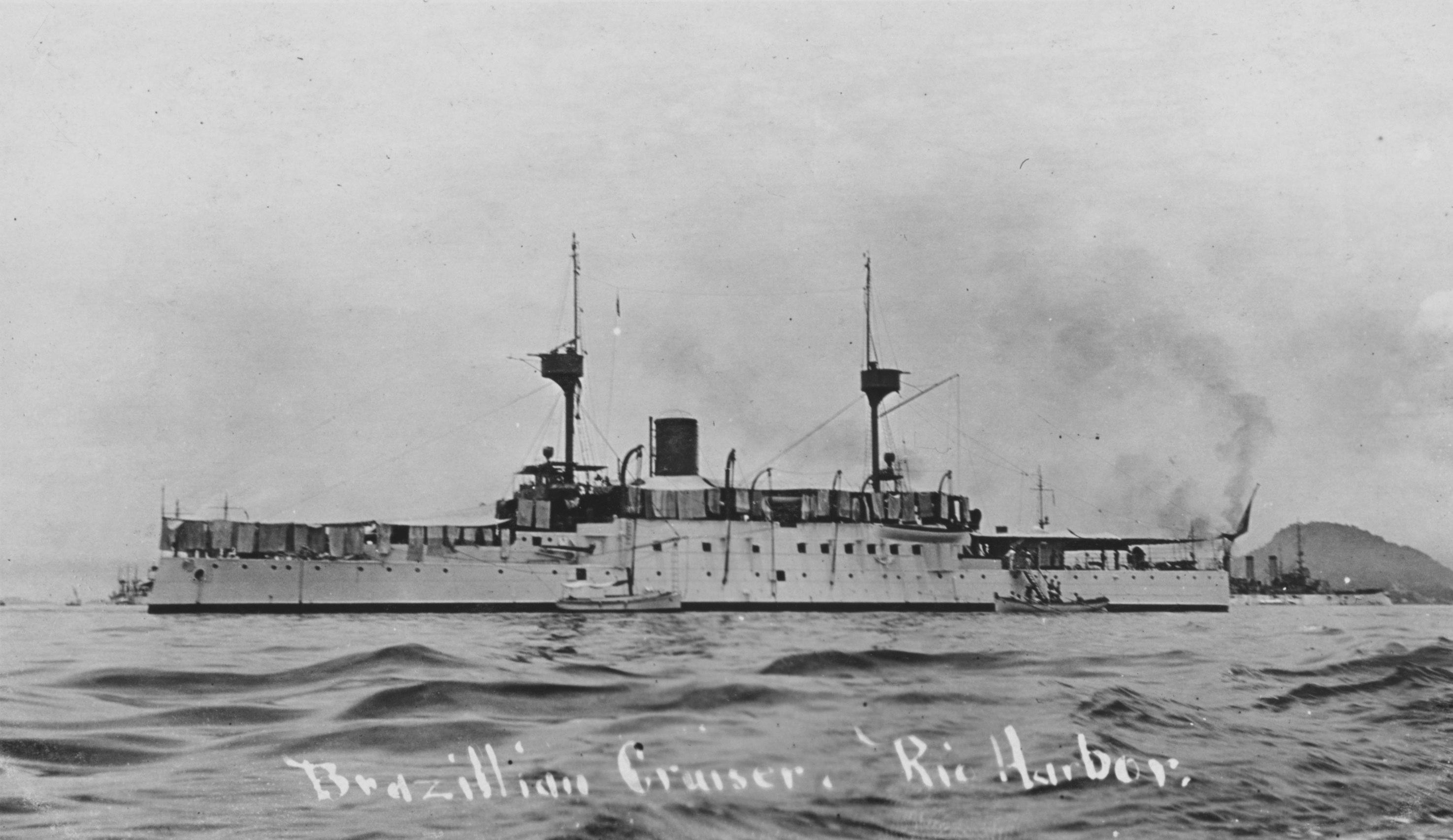
- Deodoro

Class overview
- Name: Deodoro class
- Builders: Société Nouvelle des Forges et Chantiers de la Méditerranée, La Seyne, France
- Operators: Brazilian Navy; Mexican Navy
- Preceded by: Javary class
- Succeeded by: None
- Built: 1898-1899
- In service: 1900-1936
- Completed: 2
- Retired: 2

General characteristics
- Type: Coastal defence battleship
- Displacement: 3,162 tons standard
- Length: 81.5 meters
- Beam: 14.4 meters
- Draught: 4.19 meters
- Propulsion: 2 shaft triple expansion engines; 8 Lagrafel d'Allest boilers; 3,400 ihp (2,500 kW)
- Speed: 15 knots (28 km/h)
- Complement: 200
- Armament: 2 × Armstrong 9.2-inch, 45 caliber guns in 2 single turrets; 4 × 4.7-inch, .50-caliber guns; 6 × 6-pounder (57 mm) Hotchkiss guns; 2 × 17.7 (450 mm) torpedo tubes mounted on the beam
- Armour: Belt: 350–150 mm; Deck: 45 mm; Casemate: 75 mm (3.0 in); Turret face: 220 mm (8.7 in)
- Notes: In 1912 both vessels were modernized with 8 Babcock & Wilcox oil-firing boilers, replacing the coal-fired boilers. 400 t of oil were carried.

The Deodoro class were two French-designed and -built coastal defense battleships built for the Brazilian Navy in the late 1890s. Upon their completion, Scientific American called them small vessels of a type "built only for second-rate naval powers," but also noted that it was a "wonder ... so much armor and armament could be carried" on a ship of its size. They served the Brazilian Navy as its only modern armored warships until the arrival of two dreadnoughts in 1910.

== About ==
The ships had a low freeboard and long superstructures with single-gun main turrets arranged at each end. Their secondary batteries were also mounted at each end of the superstructure, albeit in casemates in each corner. All used British Armstrong guns.

In 1912, both ships were overhauled with new propulsion and armament. In 1924, Brazil sold Marshal Deodoro to the Mexican Navy. She served for another 14 years, primarily as a training vessel.

== Deodoro-class coast-defense ships ==
- Deodoro (sold to Mexico and commissioned as the Anáhuac)
- Floriano (scrapped)

== See also ==
- List of historical ships of the Brazilian Navy

== Bibliography ==
- Lyon, Hugh (1979). "Brazil". In Chesneau, Roger & Kolesnik, Eugene M. (eds.). Conway's All the World's Fighting Ships 1860–1905. Conway Maritime Press. ISBN 0-85177-133-5.
- Silverstone, Paul H. (1984). Directory of the World's Capital Ships. Hippocrene Books. ISBN 0-88254-979-0.
