= Brazilian coastal defense ship Floriano =

Historic Brazilian Navy ship

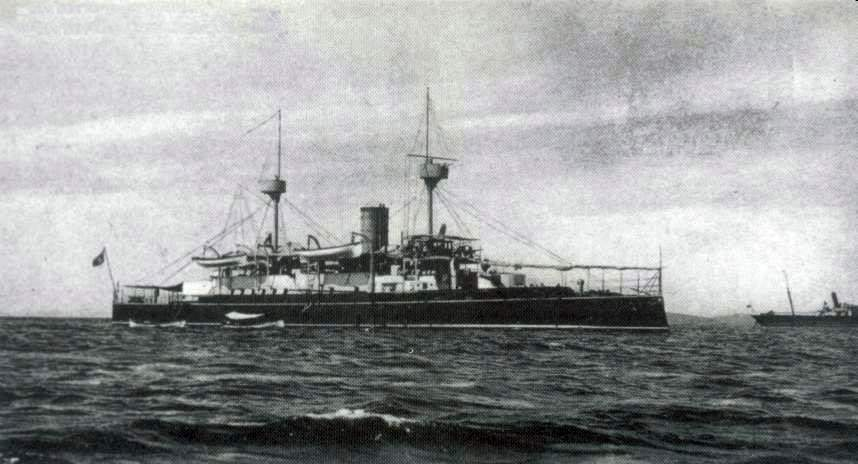
- Floriano, c. 1899

History

Brazil
- Name: Marshal Floriano
- Namesake: Floriano Peixoto
- Ordered: 1890s
- Builder: Forges et Chantiers de la Méditerranée, La Seyne, France
- Laid down: 1896
- Launched: 6 July 1899
- Completed: 1900
- Decommissioned: 1924
- Fate: Scrapped

General characteristics
- Type: Coast defense ship
- Displacement: 3,162 tons standard
- Length: 267 feet 6 inches (82 m)
- Beam: 47 feet 3 inches (14 m)
- Draught: 13 feet 2 inches (4 m)
- Propulsion: 8 Lagrafel d'Allest boilers; Vertical triple expansion engines; 3,400 ihp (2,500 kW); Coal-fired, capacity 236 tonnes (232 long tons; 260 short tons)
- Speed: 15.5 knots (29 km/h; 18 mph) maximum
- Complement: 200
- Armament: 2 × Armstrong 9.2 inches (230 mm)/45 caliber guns in 2 single turrets; 4 × 4.7 inches (120 mm)/50 caliber guns; 2 × 6 inches (150 mm) howitzers; 4 × 6-pounder (57 millimetres (2.2 in)) Hotchkiss guns (Note: Gardiner et al, Conway's 1860–1905, 407 says the ship carried six of these guns, and does not list the 1-pounders.); 2 × 1-pounder (37 millimetres (1.5 in)) autocannon; 2 × 18 inches (460 mm) torpedo tubes
- Armour: Belt: 5 feet 6 inches (1.68 m) depth, 13.75 inches (349 mm) tapering to 4 inches (100 mm) thick; Deck: 1.3 inches (33 mm); Casemate: 2.9 in (74 mm); Turret face: 8.6 in (220 mm)

Floriano was a Deodoro-class coastal defense ship built for the Brazilian Navy at the end of the nineteenth century. Ordered from the French shipbuilder Forges et Chantiers de la Méditerranée she was launched on 6 July 1899 at their La Seyne shipyard.

== See also ==
- List of historical ships of the Brazilian Navy

== Bibliography ==
- Brassey, TA, ed. (1897). The Naval Annual, 1897. Portsmouth: J Griffin and Company. OCLC 5973345.
- "Floriano." Serviço de Documentação da Marinha — Histórico de Navios. Diretoria do Patrimônio Histórico e Documentação da Marinha, Departamento de História Marítima. Accessed 19 August 2017.
- Gardiner, Robert; Chesneau, Roger, eds. (1980). Conway's All The World's Fighting Ships 1922–1946. London: Conway Maritime Press. ISBN 0-85177-146-7. OCLC 931766183.
- Gardiner, Robert; Gray, Randal, eds. (1985). Conway's All The World's Fighting Ships 1906–1921. London: Conway Maritime Press. ISBN 0-85177-245-5. OCLC 833677044.
- Lyon, Hugh (1979). "Brazil". In Chesneau, Roger & Kolesnik, Eugene M. (eds.). Conway's All the World's Fighting Ships 1860–1905. London: Conway Maritime Press. ISBN 0-85177-133-5.
- Morgan, Zachary R. (2014). Legacy of the Lash: Race and Corporal Punishment in the Brazilian Navy and the Atlantic World. Bloomington: Indiana University Press. ISBN 978-0253014207. OCLC 952824891.
- "Notes and Queries of Service Afloat and Ashore". Navy & Army Illustrated. 6 (76): 401. 16 July 1898.
- "The New Brazilian Armorclad 'Marshal Deodoro'". Scientific American. 82 (12): 184. 24 March 1900. doi:10.1038/scientificamerican03241900-184a.
