= HMS Peterel (1899) =

British warship

History

United Kingdom
- Name: HMS Peterel
- Builder: Palmers, Jarrow
- Launched: 30 March 1899
- Fate: Sold for breaking up, 30 August 1919

General characteristics
- Class & type: Spiteful-class destroyer
- Displacement: 350 long tons (356 t)
- Length: 210 ft (64 m)
- Propulsion: Triple expansion steam engines; Coal-fired Reed boilers; 6,200 hp (4,623 kW)
- Speed: 30 knots (56 km/h; 35 mph)
- Complement: 63
- Armament: 1 × QF 12-pounder gun; 2 × 18 inch (450 mm) torpedo tubes

HMS Peterel was one of two Spiteful-class destroyers to serve with the Royal Navy. She was built by Palmers, was 215 feet long and the 6,200 H.P. produced by her Reed boilers gave her a top speed of 30 knots. She was armed, as was standard, with a twelve pounder and two torpedo tubes. She served in home waters throughout the Great War and was sold off in 1919.

== Design and construction ==
Peterel was laid down (as Yard number 745) on 29 July 1898 by the Jarrow shipbuilder Palmers Shipbuilding and Iron Company Limited. Construction began 'on spec' (i.e. as a private venture by the builder without a specific order), but the part-built ship was included in a January 1899 tender by Palmers to supply three destroyers (Note: The other two destroyers were Myrmidon and Syren.) to the Royal Navy under a supplement to the 1899–1900 shipbuilding programme. (Note: In total this supplement to the programme authorised the purchase of four battleships, four cruisers and twelve destroyers.) The ship was launched on 30 March 1899 and Palmers' tender accepted in April 1899, the contract price being £47,149 per ship.

Peterel closely resembled her sister ship Spiteful, built by Palmers under the previous year's shipbuilding programme, and like Spiteful had four funnels. She was 219 feet 6 inches (66.90 m) long overall, with a beam of 20 feet 9 inches (6.32 m) and a draught of 8 feet 11 inches (2.72 m). Displacement was 370 long tons (380 t) light and 420 long tons (430 t) full load. Four Reed boilers fed steam at 250 pounds per square inch (1,700 kPa) to triple expansion steam engines rated at 6,200 indicated horsepower (4,600 kW) and driving two propeller shafts, giving a speed of 30 knots (56 km/h; 35 mph). 91 tons of coal carried.

Armament was a single QF 12-pounder 12 cwt (3 in-calibre or 76 mm) gun on a platform on the ship's conning tower (in practice the platform was also used as the ship's bridge), backed up by five 6-pounder guns, and two 18-inch (450 mm) torpedo tubes.

== Service history ==
Peterel was delivered at Portsmouth in February 1900 for completion and armament and was completed in July that year. On 16 March 1901, Peterel, as part of the Portsmouth Instructional Flotilla, was due to escort the liner Ophir, carrying the Duke and Duchess of Cornwall and York (the future King George V and Queen Mary), out of Portsmouth harbour as the Prince and Princess started a tour of the British Empire. Peterel took part in the 1901 Naval Manoeuvres. On 13 September 1904, Peterel was commissioned for comparative trials against sister-ship Spiteful, which had been modified to use oil fuel.

In 1910 Peterel was a member of the 4th Destroyer Flotilla based at Portsmouth, remaining part of the flotilla in 1912. On 30 August 1912 the Admiralty directed all destroyers were to be grouped into classes designated by letters based on contract speed and appearance. As a four-funneled 30-knotter destroyer, Peterel was assigned to the B Class.

In 1912, older destroyers were organised into Patrol Flotillas, with Peterel being part of the 6th Flotilla, based at Portsmouth, in March 1913. Peterel remained part of the 6th Flotilla in January 1914, but by February, had transferred to the 8th Flotilla, another patrol flotilla, based at Devonport. She remained part of the 8th Flotilla in July 1914, on the eve of the outbreak of the First World War.

On the outbreak of war, the Eighth Flotilla was deployed to the Firth of Forth, carrying out patrol duties in support of the Grand Fleet. Peterel remained part of the 8th Flotilla, now designated a Local Defence Flotilla, in June 1917, but in July had transferred to the East Coast Convoy Flotilla. By August, Peterel, along with most of the rest of the East Coast Convoy Flotilla had transferred to the 7th Destroyer Flotilla, still employed on escorting convoys on the East coast. Peterel remained part of the 7th Flotilla there for the remainder of the war.

By February 1919, Peterel had left the 7th Flotilla, and was listed as temporarily at the Nore. Peterel was sold for scrap on 30 August 1919.

== Pennant numbers ==
Pennant number	Date
P74	1914
D88	September 1915
D68	January 1918
H54	September 1918

== Bibliography ==
- Brassey, T. A., ed. (1902). The Naval Annual 1902. Portsmouth, UK: J Griffin and Co.
- Chesneau, Roger & Kolesnik, Eugene M., eds. (1979). Conway's All The World's Fighting Ships 1860–1905. London: Conway Maritime Press. ISBN 0-85177-133-5.
- Colledge, J. J.; Warlow, Ben (2006) [1969]. Ships of the Royal Navy: The Complete Record of All Fighting Ships of the Royal Navy from the 15th Century to the Present (3rd Rev ed.). London: Chatham Publishing. ISBN 978-1-86176-281-8. OCLC 67375475.
- Dittmar, F.J.; Colledge, J.J. (1972). British Warships 1914–1919. Shepperton, UK: Ian Allan. ISBN 0-7110-0380-7.
- Friedman, Norman (2009). British Destroyers: From Earliest Days to the Second World War. Barnsley, UK: Seaforth Publishing. ISBN 978-1-84832-049-9.
- Gardiner, Robert & Gray, Randal, eds. (1985). Conway's All The World's Fighting Ships 1906–1921. London: Conway Maritime Press. ISBN 0-85177-245-5.
- Lyon, David (2001) [1996]. The First Destroyers. London: Caxton Editions. ISBN 1-84067-3648.
- Manning, T. D. (1961). The British Destroyer. London: Putnam & Co. OCLC 6470051.
- March, Edgar J. (1966). British Destroyers: A History of Development, 1892–1953; Drawn by Admiralty Permission From Official Records & Returns, Ships' Covers & Building Plans. London: Seeley Service. OCLC 164893555.
