= HMS Bullfinch (1898) =

Destroyer of the Royal Navy

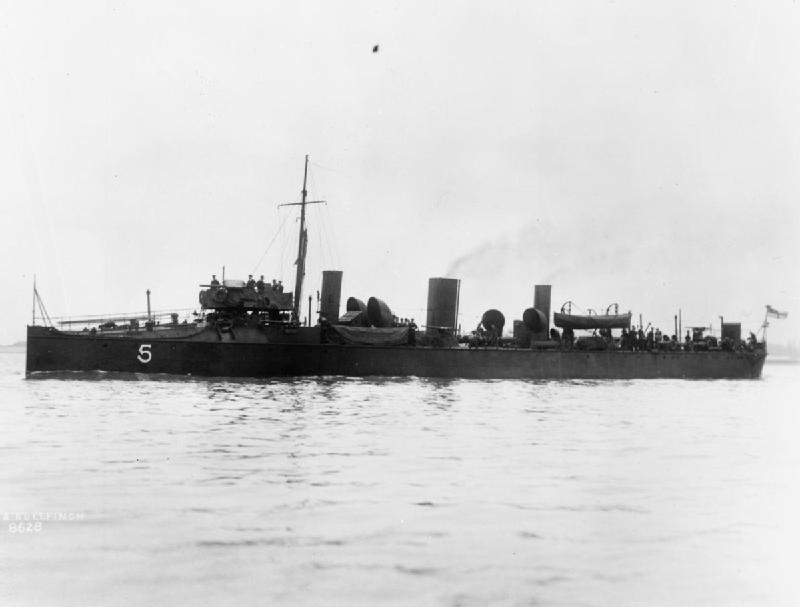
- HMS Bullfinch

History

United Kingdom
- Name: HMS Bullfinch
- Ordered: 1896 – 1897 Naval Estimates
- Builder: Earl's Shipbuilding and Engineering Company Limited, Hull, Yorkshire
- Laid down: 17 September 1896
- Launched: 10 February 1898
- Commissioned: June 1901
- Out of service: Laid up in reserve 1919
- Fate: 10 June 1919 to Young of Sunderland for breaking

General characteristics
- Class & type: Three-funnel, 30-knot destroyer
- Displacement: 345 long tons (351 t) standard; 390 long tons (396 t) full load; 214 ft 6 in (65.38 m) o/a; 20 ft 6 in (6.25 m) Beam; 7 ft 10 in (2.39 m) Draught
- Propulsion: 4 × Thornycroft water tube boiler; 2 × Vertical Triple Expansion (VTE) steam engines driving 2 shafts producing 6,000 shp (4,500 kW)
- Speed: 30 kn (56 km/h)
- Range: 80 tons coal; 1,490 nmi (2,760 km) at 11 kn (20 km/h; 13 mph)
- Complement: 60 officers and men
- Armament: 1 × QF 12-pounder 12 cwt Mark I L/40 naval gun on a P Mark I Low angle mount; 5 × QF 6-pdr 8 cwt naval gun L/40 Naval gun on a Mark I* low angle mount; 2 × single tubes for 18-inch (450mm) torpedoes

Service record
- Operations: World War I 1914 - 1918

HMS Bullfinch was a three-funnel, 30-knot destroyer ordered by the Royal Navy under the 1896–1897 Naval Estimates. She was the third ship to carry this name since it was introduced in 1857 for a 4-gun wooden-screw gunboat.

== Construction ==
Bullfinch was laid down on 17 September 1896, at the Earle's Shipbuilding and Engineering Company Limited shipyard at Hull, Yorkshire, and launched on 10 February 1898. During her trials while steaming at 30 knots (56 km/h; 35 mph) she suffered a major accident in which the connecting rod to the high-pressure cylinder broke and released steam into the forward engine room. Eight individuals were killed and six were injured. The broken connecting rod punctured the hull, and Lieutenant F.G. Dineley (in command during trials) ordered the use of collision mats to stem the intake of water and she was able to make port. The destroyer was completed and accepted by the Royal Navy in June 1901.

== Service history ==
=== Early service ===
After commissioning Bullfinch was assigned to the Channel Fleet. Commander Brian Barttelot was appointed in command on 24 February 1902, and she was assigned to the Portsmouth instructional flotilla. In May 1902 she towed her sister ship HMS Dove to Queenstown, after the latter had struck a rock off Kildorney.

She spent her operational career mainly in Home Waters operating with the Channel Fleet as part of the Devonport Flotilla.

On 30 August 1912 the Admiralty directed all destroyer classes were to be designated by alpha characters starting with the letter 'A'. Since her design speed was 30 knots and she had three funnels, she was assigned to the C class. After 30 September 1913, she was known as a C-class destroyer and had the letter 'C' painted on the hull below the bridge area and on either the fore or aft funnel.

=== World War I ===
In July 1914 Bullfinch was in active commission in the 7th Destroyer Flotilla based at Devonport tendered to Leander, destroyer depot ship to the 7th Flotilla. In September 1914 the 7th Flotilla was redeployed to the Humber River. She remained in this deployment until the cessation of hostilities. Her employment within the Humber Patrol included anti-submarine and counter-mining patrols. On 15 August 1914, she was involved in a collision in British waters, with the loss of four stokers.

In 1919 Bullfinch was paid off and laid-up in reserve awaiting disposal. She was sold on 10 June 1919 to Young of Sunderland for breaking.

== Pennant numbers ==
| Pennant Number | From | To |
|---|---|---|
| D17 | 6 Dec 1914 | 1 Sep 1915 |
| D48 | 1 Sep 1915 | 1 Jan 1918 |
| D15 | 1 Jan 1918 | 1 Apr 1918 |
| H04 | 1 Apr 1918 | 10 Jun 1919 |

== Bibliography ==
- Chesneau, Roger & Kolesnik, Eugene M., eds. (1979). Conway's All The World's Fighting Ships 1860–1905. London: Conway Maritime Press. ISBN 0-85177-133-5.
- Colledge, J. J.; Warlow, Ben (2006) [1969]. Ships of the Royal Navy: The Complete Record of All Fighting Ships of the Royal Navy from the 15th Century to the Present (3rd Rev ed.). London: Chatham Publishing. ISBN 978-1-86176-281-8. OCLC 67375475.
- Dittmar, F. J. & Colledge, J. J. (1972). British Warships 1914–1919. Shepperton, UK: Ian Allan. ISBN 0-7110-0380-7.
- Friedman, Norman (2009). British Destroyers: From Earliest Days to the Second World War. Barnsley, UK: Seaforth Publishing. ISBN 978-1-84832-049-9.
- Gardiner, Robert & Gray, Randal, eds. (1985). Conway's All The World's Fighting Ships 1906–1921. London: Conway Maritime Press. ISBN 0-85177-245-5.
- Lyon, David (2001) [1996]. The First Destroyers. London: Caxton Editions. ISBN 1-84067-3648.
- Manning, T. D. (1961). The British Destroyer. London: Putnam & Co. OCLC 6470051.
- March, Edgar J. (1966). British Destroyers: A History of Development, 1892–1953; Drawn by Admiralty Permission From Official Records & Returns, Ships' Covers & Building Plans. London: Seeley Service. OCLC 164893555.
