= General Keyes =

General Keyes may refer to:

- Charles Patton Keyes (1822–1896), British Indian Army general
- Erasmus D. Keyes (1810–1895), Union Army major general
- Geoffrey Keyes (1888–1967), U.S. Army lieutenant general
- Terence Keyes (1877–1939), British Indian Army brigadier general

== See also ==
- Ronald Keys (born 1945), U.S. Air Force general
- William M. Keys (born 1937), U.S. Marine Corps lieutenant general
