= HMS Calliope (1884) =

Calypso-class corvette

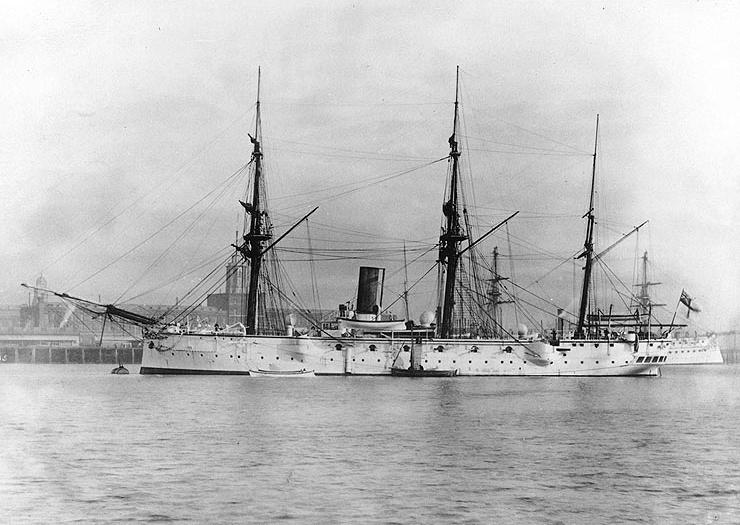
- HMS Calliope

History

United Kingdom
- Name: HMS Calliope
- Builder: HM Dockyard Portsmouth
- Cost: Hull: £82,000; machinery: £38,000
- Laid down: 1 October 1881
- Launched: 24 June 1884
- Sponsored by: Lady Phipps Hornby
- Completed: 25 January 1887
- Commissioned: 25 January 1887
- Maiden voyage: 1 March 1887
- Renamed: Helicon (June 1915 – October 1931); Calliope (October 1931 – 1951)
- Nickname(s): "Hurricane Jumper"
- Fate: Sold for breaking 1951

General characteristics
- Class & type: Calypso-class corvette
- Displacement: 2,770 long tons
- Length: 235 ft (71.6 m) pp
- Beam: 44 ft 6 in (13.6 m)
- Draught: 19 ft 11 in (6.1 m)
- Installed power: 6 boilers; 4,023 ihp (3,000 kW)
- Propulsion: 4-cylinder compound-expansion J. and G. Rennie steam engine, driving a single screw
- Sail plan: Barque rig (Note: The sail plan likely varied during the ship's career. Published sources say Calliope has a barque rig, and some photographs show a barque rig. E.g., Paine, Warships of the World to 1900 (2000), p. 29; Rousmaniere, After the Storm (2002), p. 96. Other images show a ship rig, with yards and square sails on the mizzenmast. Archibald, The Metal Fighting Ship in the Royal Navy (1970), p. 49; J.S. Virtue & Co., "HMS Calliope, 3rd class cruiser"; see also the "Starboard bow quarter view" on this page, which shows yards on the mizzen. A full-rigged ship has square sails on the mizzenmast, while a barque has fore-and-aft sails.)
- Speed: 13.75 kn (25.5 km/h) powered; 14.75 kn (27.3 km/h) forced draught
- Range: 4,000 nmi (7,400 km) @ 10-knot (19 km/h)
- Complement: 293 (later 317)
- Armament: 4 × BL 6-inch (152.4 mm) Mark II 26 calibre guns; 12 × BL 5-inch (127.0 mm) guns; 6 QF Nordenfelt guns; 4 Gardner machine guns; 2 14-inch (360 mm) torpedo carriages
- Armour: Deck: 1.5 in (38 mm) over engines

HMS Calliope was a Calypso-class corvette (later classified as a third-class cruiser) of the Royal Navy of the United Kingdom which served from 1887 until 1951. Exemplifying the transitional nature of the late Victorian navy, Calliope was a sailing corvette—the last such ship built for the Royal Navy—but supplemented the full sail rig with a powerful engine. Steel was used for the hull, and like the earlier iron-hulled corvettes, Calliope was cased with timber and coppered below the waterline, in the same manner as wooden ships.

Calliope was known for "one of the most famous episodes of seamanship in the 19th century", when the vessel was the only ship present to avoid being sunk or stranded in the tropical cyclone that struck Apia, Samoa in 1889. After retirement from active service, Calliope served as a training ship until 1951, when she was sold for breaking.

== Design and construction ==
Calliope and sister ship Calypso comprised the Calypso class of corvettes designed by Nathaniel Barnaby. Part of a long line of cruiser classes built for protecting trade routes and colonial police work, they were the last two sailing corvettes built for the Royal Navy. Corvettes had been built of iron since the Volage class of 1867, but the Calypsos and the preceding Comus class used steel. Corvettes were designed to operate across the vast distances of Britain's maritime empire and could not rely on dry docks for maintenance. Since iron and steel hulls were subject to biofouling and could not easily be cleaned, the established practice of copper sheathing was extended to protect them; the metal plating of the hull was timber-cased and coppered below the waterline. The only armour was a 1.5-inch (38-mm) armoured deck covering the machinery spaces, but coal bunkers along the sides gave some protection to the machinery spaces.

Calypso and Calliope differed from their nine predecessors of the Comus class in armament; they were also slightly longer, had a deeper draught, and displaced 390 tons more. Originally planned as a ten-gun corvette, Calliope was completed with four 6-inch (152.4 mm) breechloaders in sponsons fore and aft on each side, twelve 5-inch (127.0 mm) breechloaders in broadside between the 6-inch guns, and six quick-firing Nordenfelt guns.

The compound-expansion steam engine was supplied with steam by six boilers and developed 4,023 indicated horsepower (3,000 kW). This was 50% more powerful than the predecessor class, which gave the corvette one more knot of speed, a difference that would be crucial in the disaster that made Calliope famous. The engine drove a single feathering screw, and enabled the vessel to reach a speed of 13¾ knots, or 14¾ knots with forced draught. The vessel nevertheless was a fully rigged sailing ship, allowing sustained service in areas where coaling stations were far apart. Calliope was well-suited to distant cruising service for the British Empire at its Victorian peak.

Although laid down in 1881, Calliope was not launched until 1884, and was placed in reserve at Portsmouth before completion. She was activated on 25 January 1887, when the vessel was placed in commission for the China Station, the sort of distant service for which the class had been designed. The same year, all corvettes and frigates were re-classified as "cruisers", with Calliope and Calypso falling into the "third-class cruiser" category.

== Service with the fleet ==
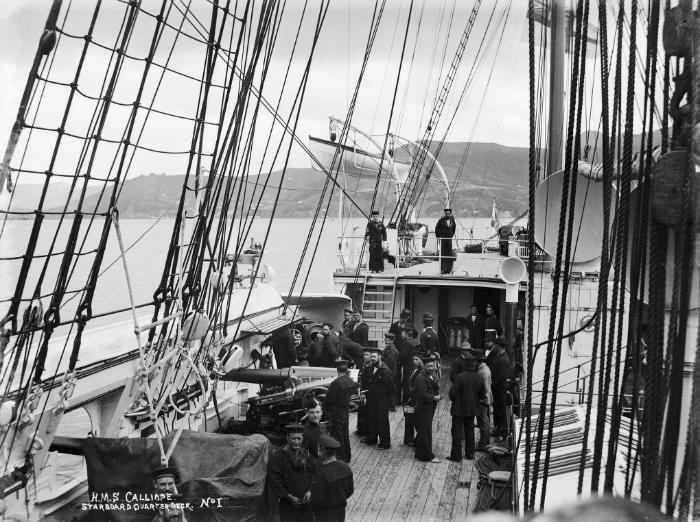
Starboard quarterdeck, while at Port Chalmers, New Zealand De Maus Collection, Alexander Turnbull Library

The British Empire was the largest on Earth, and Britain protected that empire and its trade routes with the world's largest navy. Great Britain assumed the role of peacekeeper on the world's oceans, and the Royal Navy was the instrument by which the Pax Britannica was kept. The global reach of the Royal Navy included the western Pacific Ocean, patrolled by the Australia Station. In 1887 Captain Henry Coey Kane took Calliope to the Pacific. At first assigned to the China Station, the vessel was reassigned to the Australia Station later in 1887. It was in New Zealand at the end of that year, and was the first vessel to enter the new Calliope Dock. In early 1888 Calliope was sent north to watch over a looming diplomatic crisis and potential military confrontation in Samoa.

This crisis had its roots in the Great Powers' competition for colonies in the last decades of the 19th century. The German Empire, invigorated by its victory over France in the Franco-Prussian War and by its unification under the Prussian monarchy, had newfound imperial ambitions that stretched beyond Europe. It had shared in the division of Africa, and in the 1880s looked to the Pacific as well. Ships of its Imperial Navy were sent to Apia in Samoa, where German agents had fomented rebellion against the indigenous government. They were countered there by the Asiatic Squadron of the United States Navy. The United States had nearly completed establishing control over its territories on the North American continent, leading American ambitions to stretch beyond its shores. The squadron was at Samoa to assert US interests in the Pacific and to watch the Germans.

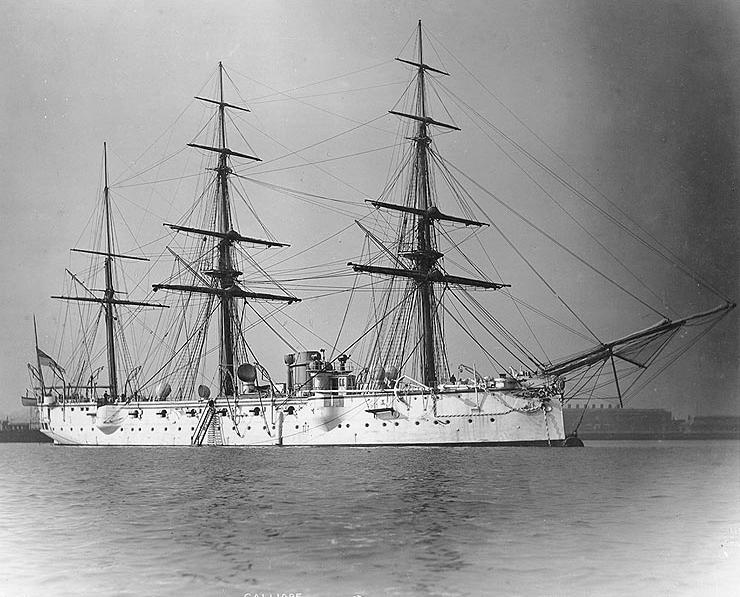
Starboard view

In March 1889, the new corvette Calliope—sent to keep the peace and protect Britain's interests in Samoa—joined the competing squadrons of the Imperial German and United States navies at Apia. The harbour there was primitive, small and nearly surrounded by reefs. Perhaps fit for four ships, the anchorage held seven warships and six merchant vessels on 14 March.

The barometer began to fall that day and a tropical cyclone began to form. The 1889 Apia cyclone increased in ferocity over the next two days. Rain fell in sheets, cutting visibility. Winds of 70 to 100 knots (130–185 km/h, 80–115 mph) blew directly into the anchorage, trapping the ships in the V-shaped harbour. The harbour bottom was scoured by currents and anchors lost their purchase. Operating their engines at full speed to resist the wind and waves, ships nevertheless dragged their anchors and were inexorably driven landward. Vessels collided and were thrown on the reefs or ashore, and some sank. By 09:00 on the 16th, Calliope, although still riding at anchor, had been hit by one ship and narrowly missed by another, and Captain Kane decided to attempt to escape. To relieve the strain on the five anchor cables, Calliope's boilers were producing maximum pressure; the engines were being worked "red hot", and the propeller was making 74 revolutions per minute, sufficient for 15 knots (28 km/h) in calmer waters. In spite of this titanic effort, the ship was barely able to make headway against the winds and the seas in the harbour, and anchor cables began to part.

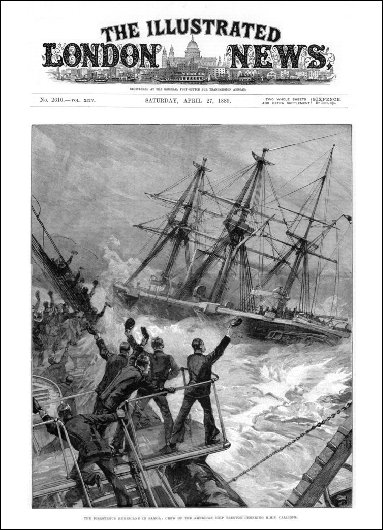
Illustrated London News for 27 April 1889; artist's conception of HMS Calliope being cheered on by the crew of USS Trenton as Calliope escapes from Apia Harbour. Calliope actually passed to Trenton's port side.

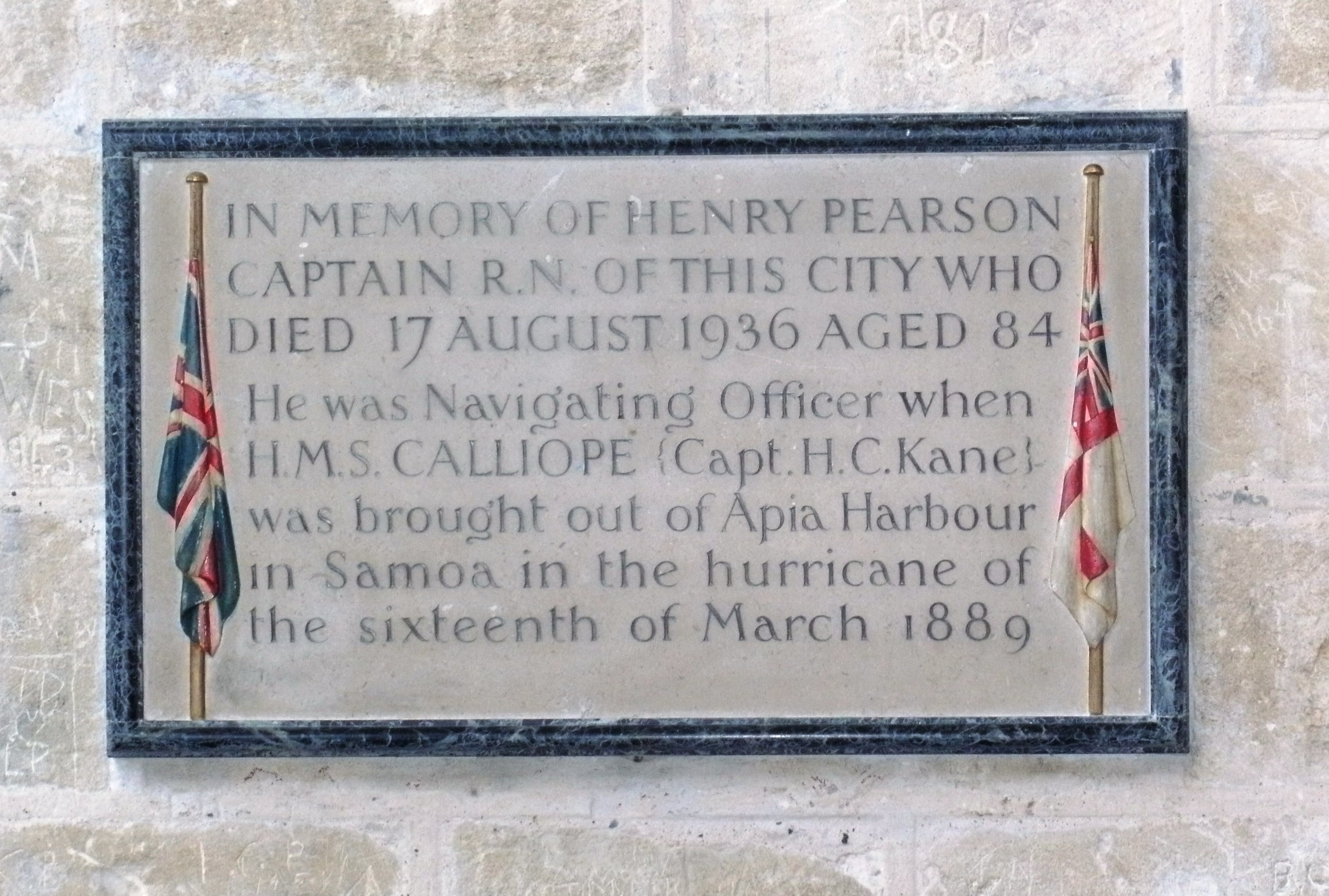
Memorial tablet to Henry Pearson (died 1936) in Winchester Cathedral, with a reference to HMS Calliope and the storm

To port and only 20 feet (6 m) away was the coral reef. Ahead were the US ships USS Vandalia and USS Trenton; to starboard were other warships. There was only a narrow opening between the vessels to one side and the ground to the other. Hemmed in by these obstacles and with the rudder at times within 6 feet (2 m) of the reef, Calliope manoeuvred while still attached to the anchor cables, which began to give way. When Captain Kane saw an opening, he slipped the anchors and drove forward. Avoiding the helpless Vandalia, he approached the sinking Trenton, coming so close that Calliope's fore yard-arm passed over the American's deck. As Calliope rolled to port, the yard lifted over Trenton. The crew of the helpless and doomed American ship cheered Calliope as she slipped past. The British ship's drive for the open sea was called by the American commander on the scene "one of the grandest sights a seaman or anyone else ever saw; the lives of 250 souls depended on the hazardous adventure."

Making for the harbour mouth, Calliope's bow and stern alternately rose and plunged into the incoming waves; the propeller at times was spinning in air, requiring a careful hand on the throttle to keep the shaft from running away to destruction. Green seas were boarding the vessel and running the length of the deck. There were ten men on the wheel and more below handling relieving tackle on the tiller to assist in maintaining control of the rudder. Taking two hours to travel four cables, (Note: A cable is one-tenth of a nautical mile; hence Calliope had moved only about 2400 feet (740 m) in two hours.) the cruiser finally escaped the anchorage into the open sea, an achievement not known to Calliope's crew for some time, as sea spray and spume had reduced visibility to nothing.

The storm kept Calliope at sea the next two days. Re-entering the harbour on 19 March to search for the missing anchors, the crew discovered that every single ship present in the harbour—twelve in all—had been wrecked or sunk, (Note: The three German and the three American warships were wrecked, as were all six merchant ships. Paine, Warships of the World to 1900 (2000), p. 29.) and nearly every crew had been diminished by the loss of men killed by the storm. Unable to find the anchor amidst the wreckage, and his ship having sustained significant damage, Captain Kane decided to return to Australia. He turned over Calliope's diving outfit to the US Navy to assist it in salvage, and received in return boats from the wrecked American ships to replace the boats which had been stripped from Calliope by the storm.

Captain Kane then took his ship to Sydney, where they received a hero's welcome. The narrowness of Calliope's escape; the performance of the engines and the perseverance of the crew, who kept the power plant in operation for many hours during the ordeal; (Note: The reciprocating engines had been run at full power for almost twelve hours. "Calliope", Encyclopedia of New Zealand.) the seamanship of Captain Kane and officers; their bravery in slipping their anchor and facing the storm, and the respect and encouragement given to them by the crew of Trenton; made Calliope famous.

The engineer of Calliope, Henry George Bourke, was specially promoted from staff engineer to fleet engineer on 28 May 1889, "for his services in Her Majesty's ship 'Calliope,' during the recent hurricane at Samoa." He attributed his success to the superior properties of West Coast coal from New Zealand used to fire the ship's boilers; this statement attracted the custom of the British Admiralty when fuelling its ships in those waters.

Captain Kane was made Companion of the Order of the Bath (CB) in the 1891 Queen's Birthday Honours. He was cited by the Admiralty for his "nerve and decisions", given the command of HMS Victory in 1892, and in 1897 was promoted to rear-admiral.

Calliope returned to service on the Australian station after repairs were complete. At the end of 1889 it was recalled to the United Kingdom.

== In reserve ==
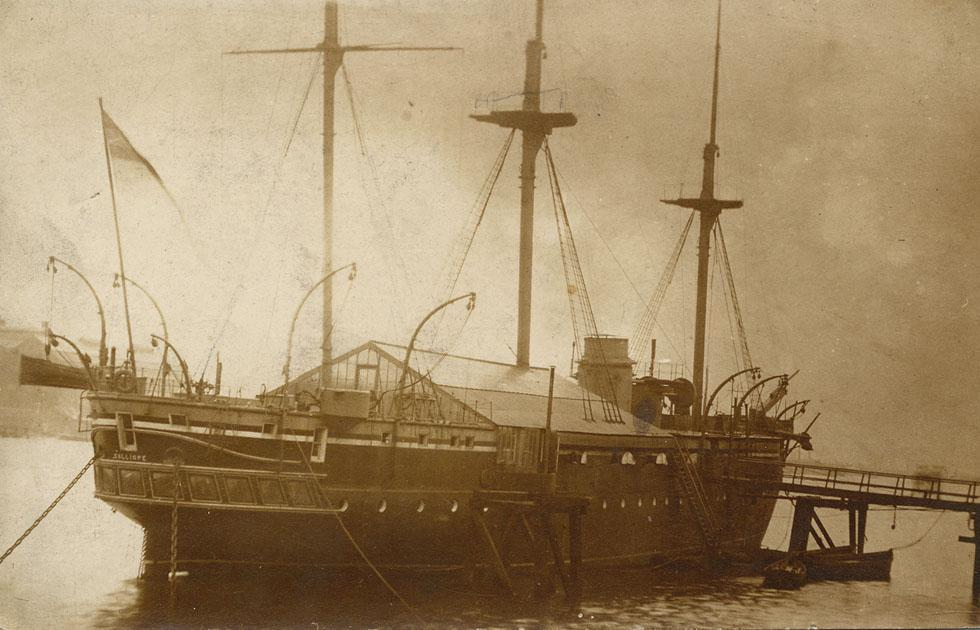
Calliope at Blyth in Northumberland c. 1920

Arriving back home in early 1890, Calliope was placed in reserve and remained there for the next seven years. In June 1897 it was present at Queen Victoria's Diamond Jubilee Review of the Fleet at Spithead. That same year Calliope became a tender to HMS Northampton, an older and larger armoured cruiser used as seagoing training ship for boys. Calliope also was occasionally used as a training cruiser, and toured the Mediterranean from February to April in 1900, and again in March 1901, and March 1902. During the summer of 1902 it was employed on a training cruise in home waters, visiting Campbeltown, Belfast Lough, Portishead, Dartmouth, Lyme Regis and Guernsey. Later that year she visited Gibraltar and the Spanish cities of Ferrol, Vilagarcía, and Mahón on Menorca. Commander Douglas Nicholson was appointed in command on 20 December 1902, serving as such throughout 1903. From February to April 1903 she was on a training cruise in the Mediterranean, visiting Vigo, Gibraltar, Malaga, Cartagena, Barcelona and Arosa Bay.

Relieved of tender duty in 1905, Calliope was returned to reserve and promptly stricken from the effective list. It was laid up at Portsmouth, and in 1906 was listed for sale for a time. The next year Calliope was moved to North East England for a new career.

== Training ship ==
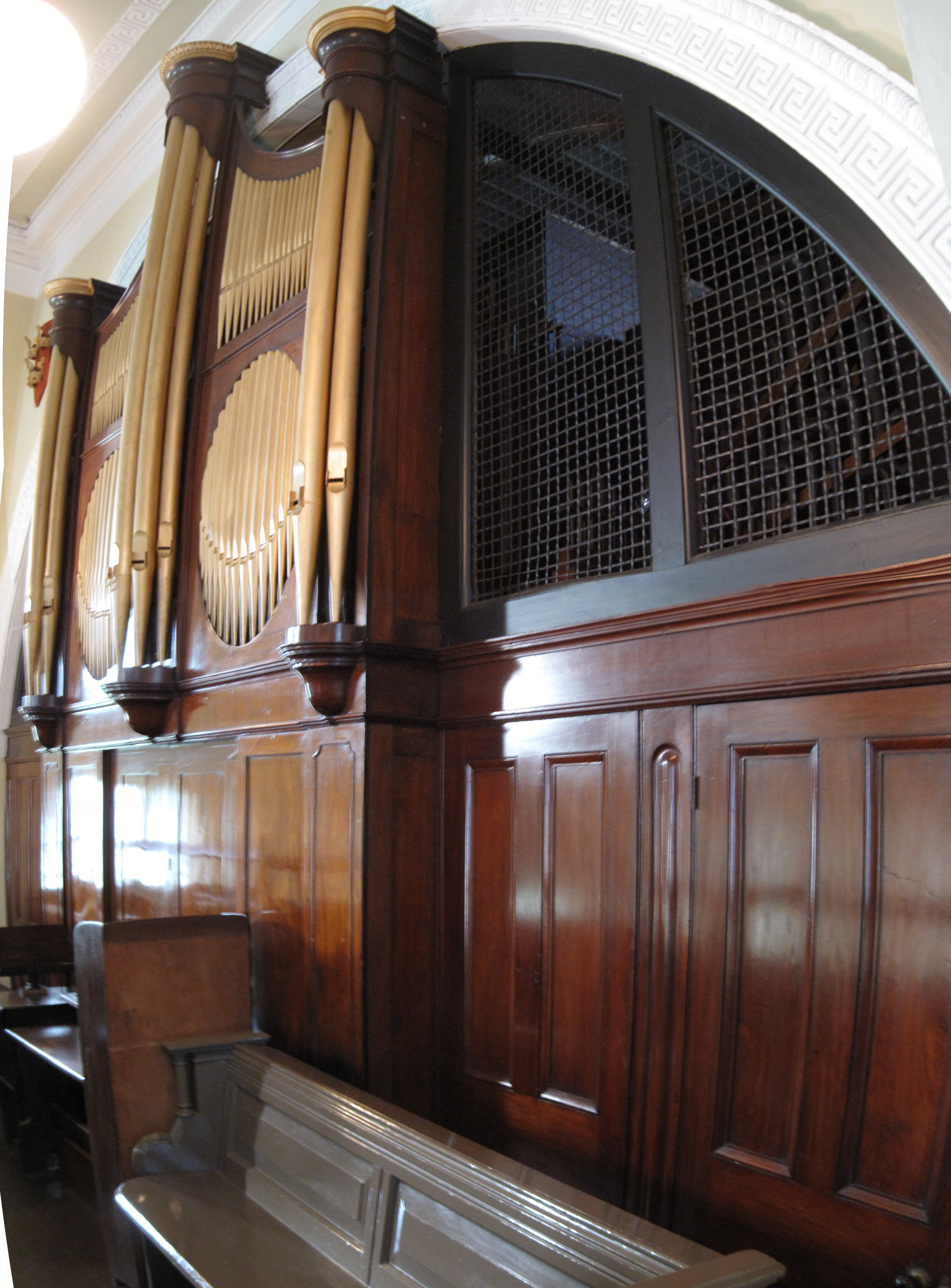
Panelling from Calliope's wardroom in organ casing at Christ Church, North Shields

On 29 October 1907 Calliope became a drill ship at Newcastle upon Tyne for the Royal Naval Volunteer Reserve, Tyne Division, and served there for over four decades. It surrendered the name "Calliope" to a C-class cruiser between 1915 and 1931, and became Helicon. After the newer Calliope was paid off in the 1930s, Helicon reverted to Calliope and retained that name until sold in 1951. When finally scrapped in 1953, the steering wheel was presented to the government of Western Samoa. The mahogany panelling from the officers' wardroom was reclaimed in 1953 and now forms the wings to the 18th century organ in the west gallery of Christ Church, North Shields, Tyne and Wear.

The name "Calliope" also lives on in the Royal Navy. In 1951 the ship's successor as training ship on the Tyne took that name, and now the shore establishment itself bears the title and honours the memory of HMS Calliope.

== Sources ==
- Archibald, E.H.H. (1971). The Metal Fighting Ship in the Royal Navy 1860–1970. Ray Woodward (illustrator). New York: Arco Publishing Co. ISBN 0-668-02509-3.
- Brassey, T.A. (1896). The Naval Annual. Portsmouth: J. Griffin and Co.
- "Calliope". An Encyclopaedia of New Zealand. Ministry for Culture and Heritage / Te Manatū Taonga. 2007 [1966]. Archived from the original on 11 January 2012. (A. H. McLintock, ed.). ISBN 978-0-478-18451-8. Retrieved 1 February 2010.
- "Calliope 60.30 1884". Historic Photograph Record. National Maritime Museum. Archived from the original on 30 October 2007. Retrieved 1 February 2010. Descriptions of photographs are reached at this search page by entering Calliope in the search field and selecting CALLIOPE 60.30 1884 Steel screw corvette (HMS) from the results.
- Colledge, J.J.; Warlow, Ben (2006) [1969] Ships of the Royal Navy (Rev. ed.) London: Chatham. ISBN 978-1-86176-281-8.
- Evans, Arthur Cornwallis (1890). The Cruise of H.M.S. "Calliope" in China, Australian and East African Waters 1887–1890. Portsmouth: Griffin and Co.
- Gray, J.A.C. (1960). Amerika Samoa: A History of American Samoa and Its United States Naval Administration. Annapolis: U. S. Naval Institute. ISBN 0-405-13038-4.
- "HMS Calliope (Corvette, 1884–1951)". Online Library of Selected Images: Ships of the British Navy. (US) Naval Historical Center (now Naval History and Heritage Command). 2002. Archived from the original on 13 April 2010.
- "Hurricane at Apia, Samoa, 15–16 March 1889". Events of the 1880s. Naval Historical Center (now Naval History and Heritage Command). 2002. Archived from the original on 12 April 2010.
- Kimberly, L.A. "Samoan Hurricane". Events of the 1880s. Naval Historical Center (now Naval History and Heritage Command).
- Kimberly, L.A. (19 March 1889). "Report of Rear-Admiral L.A. Kimberly". Naval Historical Center (now Naval History and Heritage Command). Archived from the original on 28 March 2010.
- Lind, L.J (30 December 1974). "The Epic of HMS Calliope". Naval Historical Society of Australia.
- Lyon, David (1980). Steam, Steel and Torpedoes. Ipswich: W.S. Cowell, Ltd. for HM Stationery Office. p. 39. ISBN 0-11-290318-5.
- Lyon, David and Winfield, Rif (2004), The Sail and Steam Navy List 1815–1889. Chatham Publishing. ISBN 1-86176-032-9.
- Osbon, G. A. (1963). "Passing of the Steam and Sail Corvette: the Comus and Calliope Classes". Mariner's Mirror. 49 (3). London: Society for Nautical Research: 193–208. doi:10.1080/00253359.1963.10657732. ISSN 0025-3359.
- Paine, Lincoln P. (2000). "Warships of the World to 1900". Warships of the World: An Historical Encyclopedia. New York: Houghton Mifflin. ISBN 0-395-98414-9.
- Rousmaniere, John (2002). After the Storm: True Stories of Disaster and Recovery at Sea. Camden, MN: International Marine/McGraw-Hill. pp. 87–106. ISBN 0-07-137795-6.
- Stevenson, Robert Louis (1892). A Footnote to History, Eight Years of Trouble in Samoa. Archived from the original on 26 July 2010.
- Wilson, Graham (May–July 1996). "Glory for the Squadron: HMS Calliope in the Great Hurricane at Samoa 1889" (PDF). Journal of the Australian Naval Institute. 22 (2): 51–54.
