= Roger Keyes, 1st Baron Keyes =

Royal Navy Admiral of the Fleet (1872–1945)

Admiral of the Fleet The Right Honourable The Lord Keyes GCB KCVO CMG DSO
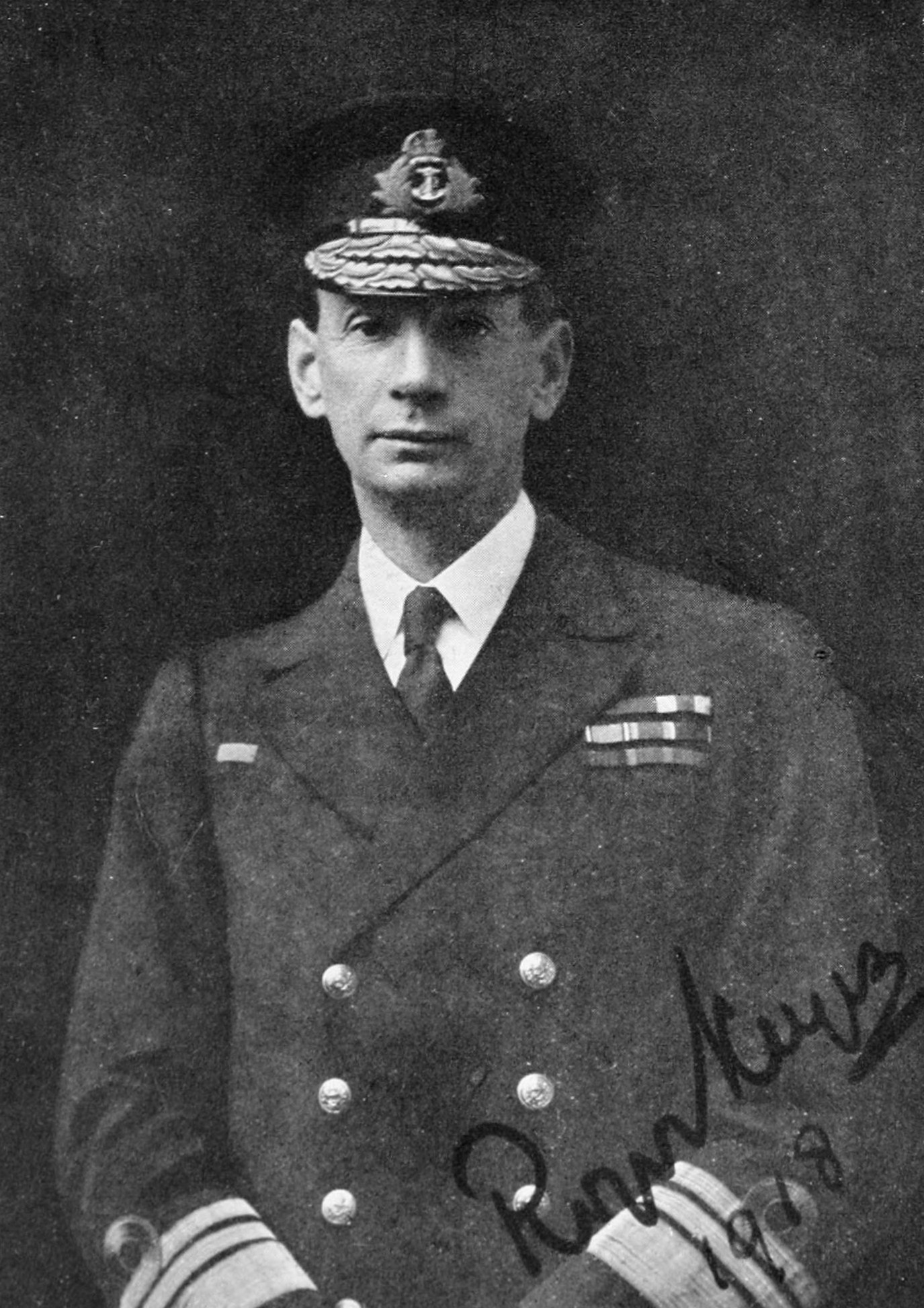
- Vice Admiral Sir Roger Keyes, 1918

Member of the House of Lords as Baron Keyes
- In office 22 January 1943 – 26 December 1945
- Preceded by: Peerage created
- Succeeded by: Roger George Bowlby Keyes

Member of Parliament for Portsmouth North
- In office 19 February 1934 – 22 January 1943
- Preceded by: Sir Bertram Falle
- Succeeded by: Sir William James

Personal details
- Born: 4 October 1872 Punjab, British India
- Died: 26 December 1945 (aged 73) Tingewick, United Kingdom
- Resting place: St James's Cemetery, Dover
- Party: Conservative
- Relations: Sir Charles Patton Keyes (father); Geoffrey Keyes (son); Phyllis Marion Keyes (sister); Terence Keyes (brother)

Military service
- Allegiance: United Kingdom
- Branch/service: Royal Navy
- Years of service: 1885–1935; 1940–1941
- Rank: Admiral of the Fleet
- Commands: HMS Opossum (1898–99); HMS Hart (1899–1900); HMS Fame (1900–01); HMS Bat (1901); HMS Falcon (1902); HMS Sprightly (1902); HMS Venus (1908–10); Commodore-in-Charge, Submarine Service (1912–14); HMS Centurion (1916–17); Dover Patrol (1917–18); Battle Cruiser Force (1919); Battlecruiser Squadron (1919–21); Atlantic Fleet (1919–21); Commander-in-Chief, Mediterranean Fleet (1925–28); Commander-in-Chief, Portsmouth (1929–31); Director of Combined Operations (1940–41)
- Battles/wars: Boxer Rebellion; First World War; Battle of Heligoland Bight; Dardanelles campaign; Zeebrugge Raid; Second World War
- Awards: Knight Grand Cross of the Order of the Bath; Knight Commander of the Royal Victorian Order; Companion of the Order of St Michael and St George; Distinguished Service Order

Admiral of the Fleet Roger John Brownlow Keyes, 1st Baron Keyes, GCB, KCVO, CMG, DSO (4 October 1872 – 26 December 1945) was a British naval officer.

As a junior officer Keyes served in a corvette operating from Zanzibar on slavery suppression missions. Early in the Boxer Rebellion, he led a mission to capture a flotilla of four Chinese destroyers moored to a wharf on the Peiho River. He was one of the first men to climb over the Peking walls, to break through to the besieged diplomatic legations and to free them.

During the First World War Keyes was heavily involved in the organisation of the Dardanelles Campaign. He took charge in an operation when six trawlers and a cruiser attempted to clear the Kephez minefield. The operation was a failure, as the Turkish mobile artillery pieces bombarded Keyes's minesweeping squadron. He went on to be Director of Plans at the Admiralty and then took command of the Dover Patrol: he altered tactics, and the Dover Patrol sank five U-boats in the first month after the implementation of Keyes's plan compared with just two in the previous two years. He also planned and led the famous raids on the German submarine pens in the Belgian ports of Zeebrugge and Ostend.

Between the wars Keyes commanded the Battlecruiser Squadron, the Atlantic Fleet and then the Mediterranean Fleet before becoming Commander-in-Chief, Portsmouth. He was elected to Parliament in 1934. During the Second World War, he initially became liaison officer to Leopold III, King of the Belgians. Wearing a full uniform in the House of Commons, he played an important role in the Norway Debate which led to the resignation of Neville Chamberlain as Prime Minister. He went on to be the first Director of Combined Operations and implemented plans for the training of commandos and raids on hostile coasts.

== Early years ==
Born the second son of General Sir Charles Patton Keyes of the Indian Army and Katherine Jessie Keyes (née Norman), Keyes told his parents from an early age: "I am going to be an Admiral". After being brought up in India and then the United Kingdom, where he attended preparatory school at Margate, he joined the Royal Navy as a cadet in the training ship HMS Britannia on 15 July 1885. He was appointed to the cruiser HMS Raleigh, flagship of the Cape of Good Hope and West Africa Station, in August 1887. Promoted to midshipman on 15 November 1887, he transferred to the corvette HMS Turquoise, operating from Zanzibar on slavery suppression missions. Promoted to sub-lieutenant on 14 November 1891 and to lieutenant on 28 August 1893, he joined the sloop HMS Beagle on the Pacific Station later that year. After returning home in 1897 he became commanding officer of the destroyer HMS Opossum at Plymouth in January 1898.

== China ==
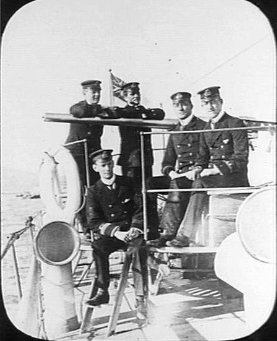
Lieutenant Keyes (sitting) with other officers aboard the destroyer HMS Fame in 1900

Keyes was then posted out to China to command another destroyer, HMS Hart, in September 1898, transferring to a newer ship, HMS Fame, in January 1899. In April 1899 he went to the rescue of a small British force which was attacked and surrounded by irregular Chinese forces while attempting to demarcate the border of the Hong Kong New Territories. He went ashore, leading half the landing party, and, while HMS Fame fired on the besiegers, he led the charge, which routed the Chinese and freed the troops.

In June 1900, early in the Boxer Rebellion, Keyes led a mission to capture a flotilla of four Chinese destroyers moored to a wharf on the Peiho River. Together with another junior officer, he took boarding parties onto the Chinese destroyers, captured the destroyers and secured the wharf. Shortly thereafter, he led a mission to capture the heavily fortified fort at Hsi-cheng: he loaded HMS Fame with a landing party of 32 men, armed with rifles, pistols, cutlasses and explosives. His men quickly destroyed the Chinese gun mountings, blew up the powder magazine, and returned to the ship.

Keyes was one of the first men to climb over the Peking walls, to break through to the besieged diplomatic legations, and to free them. For this he was promoted to commander on 9 November 1900. Keyes later recalled about the sack of Beijing: "Every Chinaman ... was treated as a Boxer by the Russian and French troops, and the slaughter of men, women, and children in retaliation was revolting".

== Diplomatic and submarine service ==
From his return to the United Kingdom and for a couple of years, Keyes served briefly in command of various ships in the instructional flotilla. He was appointed in May 1901 to the command of the destroyer HMS Bat serving in the Devonport instructional flotilla. In January 1902 he was appointed in command of the destroyer HMS Falcon, which took Bat's crew and her place in the flotilla, and four months later he again brought his crew and was appointed in command of the destroyer HMS Sprightly, which served in the flotilla from May 1902. Another change of ship came in early January 1903, when he transferred to HMS Express, then a brief month with HMS Gipsy in April 1903, until he was posted to HMS Peterel for Naval manoeuvres during summer 1903.

Keyes was posted to the intelligence section at the Admiralty in 1904 and then became naval attaché at the British Embassy in Rome in January 1905. Promoted to captain on 30 June 1905, he was appointed a Member of the Royal Victorian Order on 24 April 1906. He took up command of the cruiser HMS Venus in the Atlantic Fleet in 1908 before going on to be Inspecting Captain of Submarines in 1910 and, having been appointed Companion of the Order of the Bath on 19 June 1911, he became commodore of the Submarine Service in 1912. As head of the Submarine Service, he introduced an element of competition into the construction of submarines, which had previously been built by Vickers. He tended to go to sea in a destroyer because of the primitive visibility from early submarines. He became a naval aide-de-camp to the King on 15 September 1914.

== First World War ==
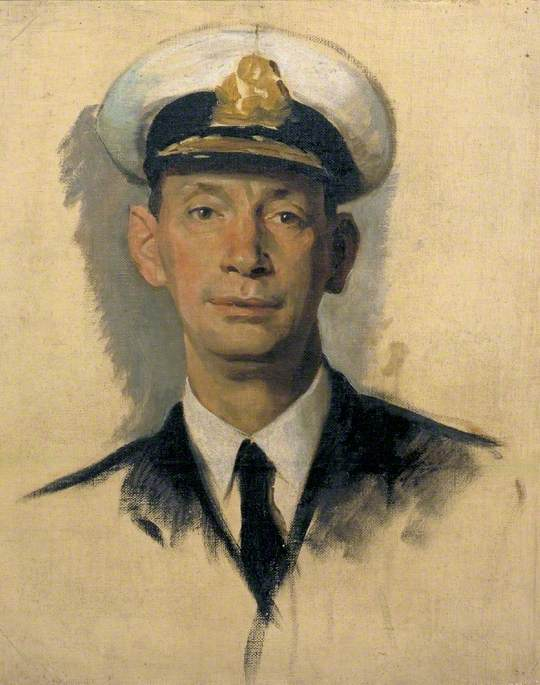
Sketch of Keyes by Glyn Warren Philpot, 1918; Imperial War Museum

When the First World War broke out, Keyes took command of the Eighth Submarine Flotilla at Harwich. He proposed, planned, and took part in the first Battle of Heligoland Bight in August 1914 flying his broad pendant in the destroyer HMS Lurcher. He went alongside the sinking German cruiser SMS Mainz and picked up 220 survivors, including the son of Grand-Admiral Tirpitz, for which he was mentioned in dispatches.

Keyes became Chief of Staff to Vice-Admiral Sackville Carden, the commander of the Royal Navy squadron off the Dardanelles, in February 1915 and was heavily involved in the organisation of the Dardanelles Campaign. After slow progress, the bombardment of the Turkish defences was called off because of low ammunition stocks and fears of a newly-laid Turkish minefield. Writing to his wife, Keyes expressed frustration at the lack of imagination of his new superior, Vice-Admiral John de Robeck, arguing that "We must have a clear channel through the minefield for the ships to close to decisive range to hammer the forts and then land men to destroy the guns."

Keyes took charge in an operation in March 1915 when six trawlers and the cruiser HMS Amethyst attempted to clear the Kephez minefield. The operation was a failure, as the Turkish mobile artillery pieces bombarded Keyes's minesweeping squadron. Heavy damage was inflicted on four of the six trawlers, while HMS Amethyst was badly hit and had her steering gear damaged. After another abortive attempt to clear the mines a few days later, the naval attempt to force the straits was abandoned, and instead, troops were landed to assault the guns. For his service during the Dardanelles Campaign, Keyes was appointed a Companion of the Order of St Michael and St George on 1 January 1916 and awarded the Distinguished Service Order on 3 June 1916.

Keyes took command of the battleship HMS Centurion in the Grand Fleet in June 1916 and, having been promoted to rear-admiral on 10 April 1917, became second in command of the 4th Battle Squadron with his flag in the battleship HMS Colossus in June 1917. He went on to be Director of Plans at the Admiralty in October 1917 and then became Commander-in-Chief, Dover and commander of the Dover Patrol in January 1918. Prior to Keyes, the Dover Patrol had been commanded by Admiral Reginald Bacon and had succeeded in sinking two German U-boats in the English Channel in the previous two years, but out of 88,000 crossings by ships only five had been torpedoed and one sunk by gunfire. After Keyes took control, he altered tactics, and the Dover Patrol sank five U-boats in the first month after implementation of Keyes's plan.

In April 1918 Keyes planned and led the famous raids on the German submarine pens in the Belgian ports of Zeebrugge and Ostend. He was advanced to Commander of the Royal Victorian Order on 30 March 1918 and promoted Knight Commander of the Order of the Bath on 24 April 1918. In May 1918 he was involved in remote control trials of unmanned aerial vehicles by the Royal Navy's D.C.B. Section. He was then advanced to Knight Commander of the Royal Victorian Order on 10 December 1918 and made a baronet on 29 December 1919. In March 1919 he was appointed (Acting) Vice-Admiral in command of the Battle Cruiser Force until it was disbanded in April 1919.

== Interwar period ==
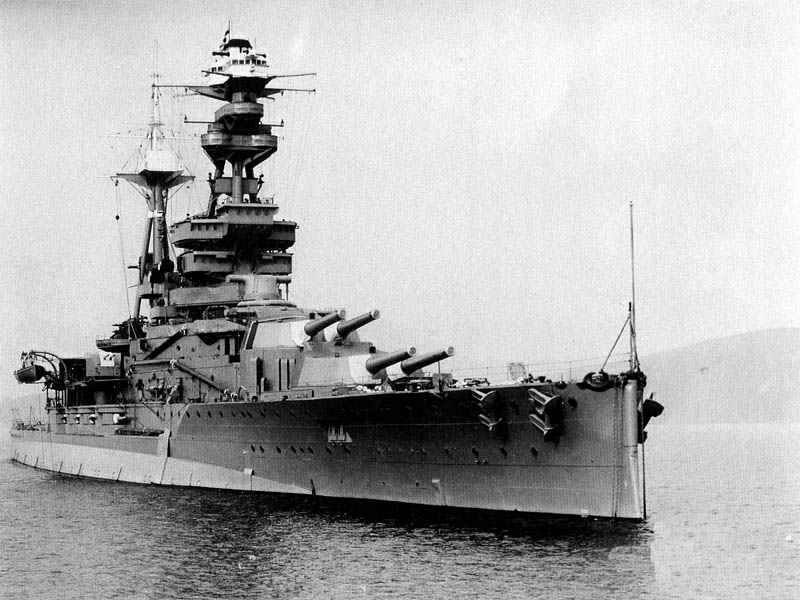
The battleship, HMS Royal Oak, the scene of an incident which Keyes was thought by the Admiralty to have handled badly

Keyes was given command of the new Battlecruiser Squadron hoisting his flag at Scapa Flow in the battlecruiser HMS Lion in March 1919. He moved his flag to the new battlecruiser HMS Hood in early 1920. Promoted to vice-admiral on 16 May 1921, he became Deputy Chief of the Naval Staff in November 1921 and then Commander-in-Chief of the Mediterranean Fleet in June 1925 with promotion to full admiral on 1 March 1926.

In January 1928 at a dance on the quarterdeck of the battleship HMS Royal Oak, Rear Admiral Bernard Collard, Second-in-command of the 1st Battle Squadron, openly lambasted Royal Marine Bandmaster, Percy Barnacle, and allegedly said "I won't have a bugger like that in my ship" in the presence of ship's officers and guests. Captain Kenneth Dewar and Commander Henry Daniel accused Collard of "vindictive fault-finding" and openly humiliating and insulting them before their crew, referring to an incident involving Collard's disembarkation from the ship in March 1928 where the admiral had openly said that he was "fed up with the ship"; Collard countercharged the two with failing to follow orders and treating him "worse than a midshipman". Letters of complaint from Dewar and Daniel were passed on to Keyes. The press picked up on the story worldwide, describing the affair—with some hyperbole—as a "mutiny". Keyes was thought by the Admiralty to have handled the matter badly and this may have adversely affected his chances of becoming First Sea Lord. He became Commander-in-Chief, Portsmouth, in May 1929, was promoted to Admiral of the Fleet on 8 May 1930 and was advanced Knight Grand Cross of the Order of the Bath on 3 June 1930. He then bought a house at Tingewick in Buckinghamshire and retired in May 1935.

Keyes was elected a Conservative Member of Parliament for Portsmouth North in January 1934. In Parliament, he fought disarmament and sought to have the Fleet Air Arm put back under the control of the navy. He was opposed to the Munich Agreement, which Neville Chamberlain had reached with Adolf Hitler in 1938 and, along with Winston Churchill, was one of the few who withheld support from the Government on that issue.

== Second World War ==
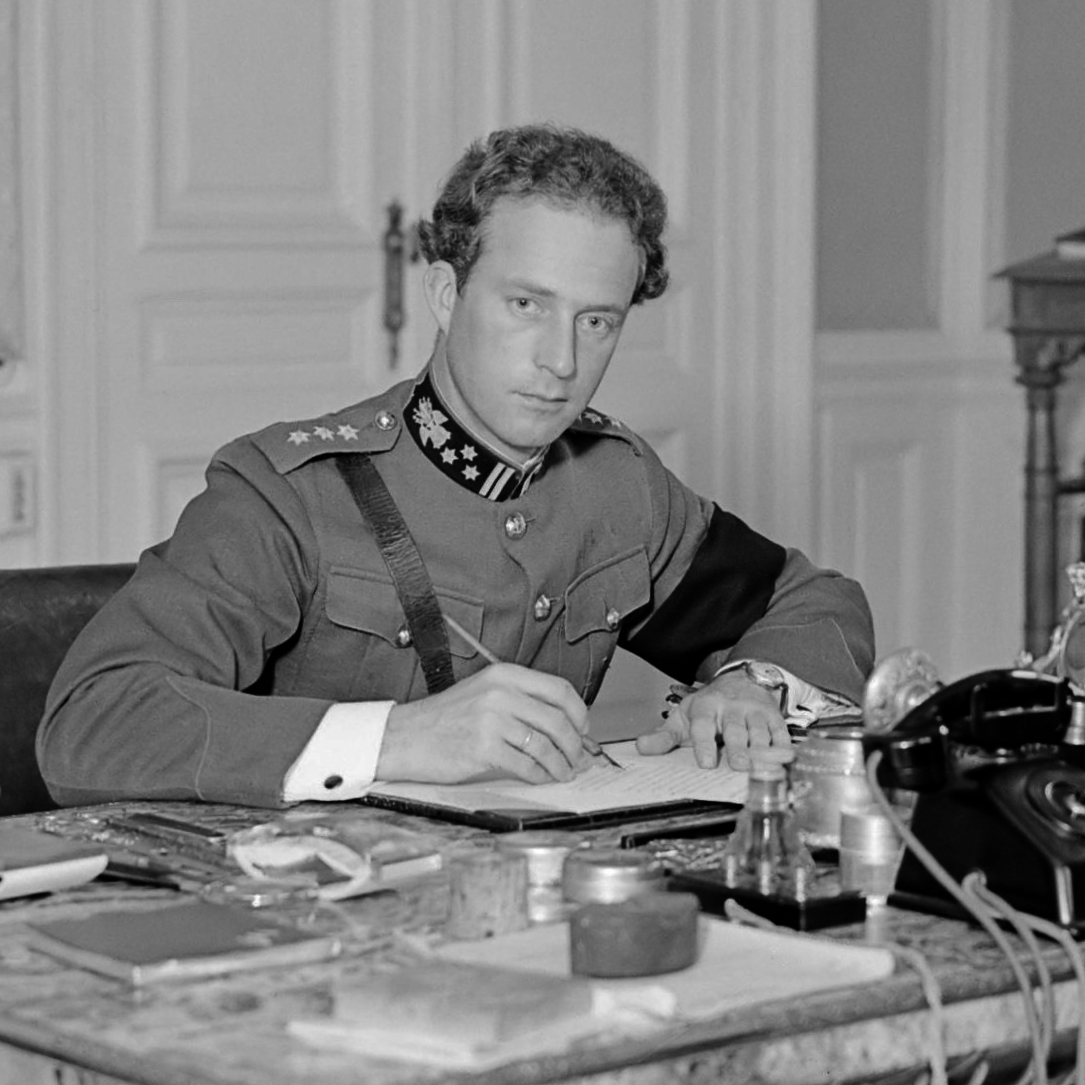
King Leopold III of Belgium to whom Keyes was liaison officer

When the Second World War broke out, Keyes was very anxious to obtain active service, but at the same time criticised the Chiefs of Staff.

Keyes reached the conclusion that the regaining of Trondheim was the key to victory in Norway. He advocated the forcing of Trondheim Fjord by battleships and the landing of a military force to recapture the city. He sought an interview with Churchill, the First Lord of the Admiralty; submitted an outline plan to seize the city; and offered to lead the expedition. If the Admiralty did not wish to hazard newer ships, he would take in old battleships. The chiefs of staff reached similar conclusions, with the addition of subsidiary landings north at Namsos and south at Åndalsnes. However they failed to send capital ships into Trondheim Fjord. German destroyers dominated the fjord, no airfields were seized to provide air cover and troops earmarked for the centre prong were never landed. When the troops were evacuated in early May 1940, there was shock in Britain. Parliament gathered for the Norway Debate on 7 and 8 May 1940. Making a dramatic entrance in the full uniform of an Admiral of the Fleet, including medals, Keyes defended the navy and strongly criticised the government. In his closing remarks Keyes invoked Horatio Nelson.

Harwood and his captains are typical of the Navy to-day. There are hundreds of young officers who are waiting eagerly to seize Warburton-Lee's torch, or emulate the deeds of Vian of the Cossack. One hundred and forty years ago, Nelson said, "I am of the opinion that the boldest measures are the safest", and that still holds good today.

— Roger Keyes, House of Commons, 7 May 1940

Chamberlain's government fell two days later, and Churchill became prime minister.

When Germany invaded the Low Countries in May 1940, Churchill appointed Keyes liaison officer to Leopold III, King of the Belgians. However, after Belgium surrendered to the Germans later that month, both Leopold and Keyes were attacked in the British press.

Keyes became the first Director of Combined Operations in June 1940 and implemented plans for the training of commandos and raids on hostile coasts. He came up with bold schemes, which were considered impractical by the Chiefs of Staff, and he was removed from office in October 1941. He was elevated to the peerage as Baron Keyes, of Zeebrugge and of Dover in the County of Kent on 22 January 1943.

Keyes suffered a detached retina in early 1944. He then undertook a goodwill tour of Canada, Australia and New Zealand at the request of the British government in July 1944. During his visit to the amphibious warfare ship USS Appalachian he suffered smoke inhalation following an attack by Japanese aircraft and never fully recovered. He died at his home in Tingewick on 26 December 1945 and was buried at the Zeebrugge corner of St James's Cemetery in Dover.

== Family ==
In 1906 Keyes married Eva Mary Bowlby; they had three daughters and two sons, including Geoffrey Keyes, who was killed in action in 1941 and was posthumously awarded the Victoria Cross.

== Honours and awards ==
- Knight Grand Cross of the Order of the Bath – 3 June 1930 (KCB – 24 April 1918, CB – 19 June 1911)
- Knight Commander of the Royal Victorian Order – 10 December 1918 (CVO – 30 March 1918, MVO – 24 April 1906)
- Companion of the Order of St Michael and St George – 1 January 1916
- Companion of the Distinguished Service Order – 3 June 1916
- Mention in Despatches – 14 March 1916
- Commandeur of the Legion of Honour (France) – 5 April 1916
- Navy Distinguished Service Medal (United States) – 16 September 1919
- Grand Cross, Order of Leopold (Belgium) – 2 August 1921 (Grand Officer – 23 July 1918)
- Croix de Guerre 1914–1918 (France) – 23 July 1918
- Order of the Iron Crown, Second Class (Austria-Hungary) – 24 February 1908
- Order of the Medjidieh, Second Class (Turkey) – 4 June 1908
- Commander of the Order of St. Maurice and St. Lazarus (Italy) – 22 June 1908
- Order of the Redeemer, Third Class (Greece) – 24 June 1909

Coat of arms of Roger Keyes, 1st Baron Keyes
Crest An open hand couped at the wrist Proper holding between the forefinger and thumb a key Or. Escutcheon Per chevron Gules and Sable three keys Or the wards of the two in chief facing each other and of the one in base to the sinister. On a canton argent a lion rampant of the first. Supporters Dexter a sailor of the Royal Navy in his working rig Proper supporting in the exterior hand a staff Argent ensigned with a naval crown Or and flying the banner of St George also Proper. Sinister a Royal Marin in field service dress armed and equipped for trench raiding all Proper. Motto Virtute Adepta

== Sources ==
- Carlyon, Les (2003). Gallipoli. Bantam. ISBN 978-0553815061.
- Glenton, Robert (1991). The Royal Oak Affair: The Saga of Admiral Collard and Bandmaster Barnacle. Pen & Sword Books. ISBN 978-0850522662.
- Halpern, Paul (1995). A Naval History of World War I. Routleadge. ISBN 978-1857284980.
- Heathcote, Tony (2002). The British Admirals of the Fleet 1734 – 1995. Pen & Sword Ltd. ISBN 0-85052-835-6.
- Keyes, Roger (1939). Adventures Ashore and Afloat. London: George Harrap & Co.
- Marder, Arthur Jacob (1969). From the Dreadnought to Scapa Flow Volume III. London: Oxford University Press. ISBN 978-1848322004.
- Preston, Diana (2000). The Boxer Rebellion: The Dramatic Story of China's War on Foreigners that Shook the World in the Summer of 1900. Berkley Books. ASIN B00BUW73OS.

Military offices
Preceded by Sir Reginald Bacon	Vice-Admiral, Dover Patrol; 1918–1919	Succeeded by Cecil Dampier
New command	Commander, Battlecruiser Squadron; 1919–1921	Succeeded by Sir Walter Cowan
Preceded by Sir Osmond Brock	Deputy Chief of the Naval Staff; 1921–1925	Succeeded by Sir Frederick Field
Preceded by Sir Osmond Brock	Commander-in-Chief, Mediterranean Fleet; 1925–1928	Succeeded by Sir Frederick Field
Preceded by Sir Osmond Brock	Commander-in-Chief, Portsmouth; 1929–1931	Succeeded by Sir Arthur Waistell
Parliament of the United Kingdom
Preceded by Bertram Godfray	Member of Parliament for Portsmouth North; 1934–1943	Succeeded by Sir William James
Baronetage of the United Kingdom
New creation	Baronet (of Dover); 1919–1945	Succeeded by Roger George Bowlby Keyes
Peerage of the United Kingdom
New creation	Baron Keyes; 1943–1945	Succeeded by Roger George Bowlby Keyes
