= General MacKinnon =

General MacKinnon may refer to:

- Henry MacKinnon (1773–1812), British Army major general
- Henry Mackinnon (1852–1929), British Army general
- William Alexander Mackinnon (British Army officer) (1830–1897), British Army lieutenant general
