= 1891 Birthday Honours =

Appointments by Queen Victoria to various orders and honours

The 1891 Birthday Honours were appointments by Queen Victoria to various orders and honours to reward and highlight good works by citizens of the British Empire. The appointments were made to celebrate the official birthday of The Queen, and were published in the London Gazette on 29 May 1891 and in The Times on 30 May 1891.

The recipients of honours are displayed here as they were styled before their new honour, and arranged by honour, with classes (Knight, Knight Grand Cross, etc.) and then divisions (Military, Civil, etc.) as appropriate.

== United Kingdom and British Empire ==
=== Baron ===
- Sir George Stephen Bt
- Samuel Cunliffe-Lister.

=== Privy Councillor ===
The Queen appointed the following to Her Majesty's Most Honourable Privy Council:

- Aretas Akers-Douglas MP
- The Hon. Evelyn Ashley.
- William Lidderdale.

=== Baronetcies ===
- The Right Hon. Peter O'Brien, Chief Justice of the High Court of Justice in Ireland.

=== Knight Bachelor ===
- Henry Bennett, Mayor of Great Grimsby.
- Archibald Geikie Director-General of the Geological Survey of the United Kingdom.
- Henry Reader Lack, Comptroller-General of the Patent Office.
- Gustavus Nathan, her Majesty's Consul-General at Vienna.
- Henry Oakley, General Manager Great Northern Railway.
- Walter Sherburne Prideaux, Clerk to the Goldsmiths' Company.
- William Charles Windeyer, Puisne Judge of the Supreme Court of New South Wales.
- Walter Thomas Wragg, Puisne Judge of the Supreme Court of Natal.
- Julian Emanuel Salomons QC Member of the Legislative Council of New South Wales.
- Robert Gillespie, of the Dominion of Canada.

=== The Most Honourable Order of the Bath ===
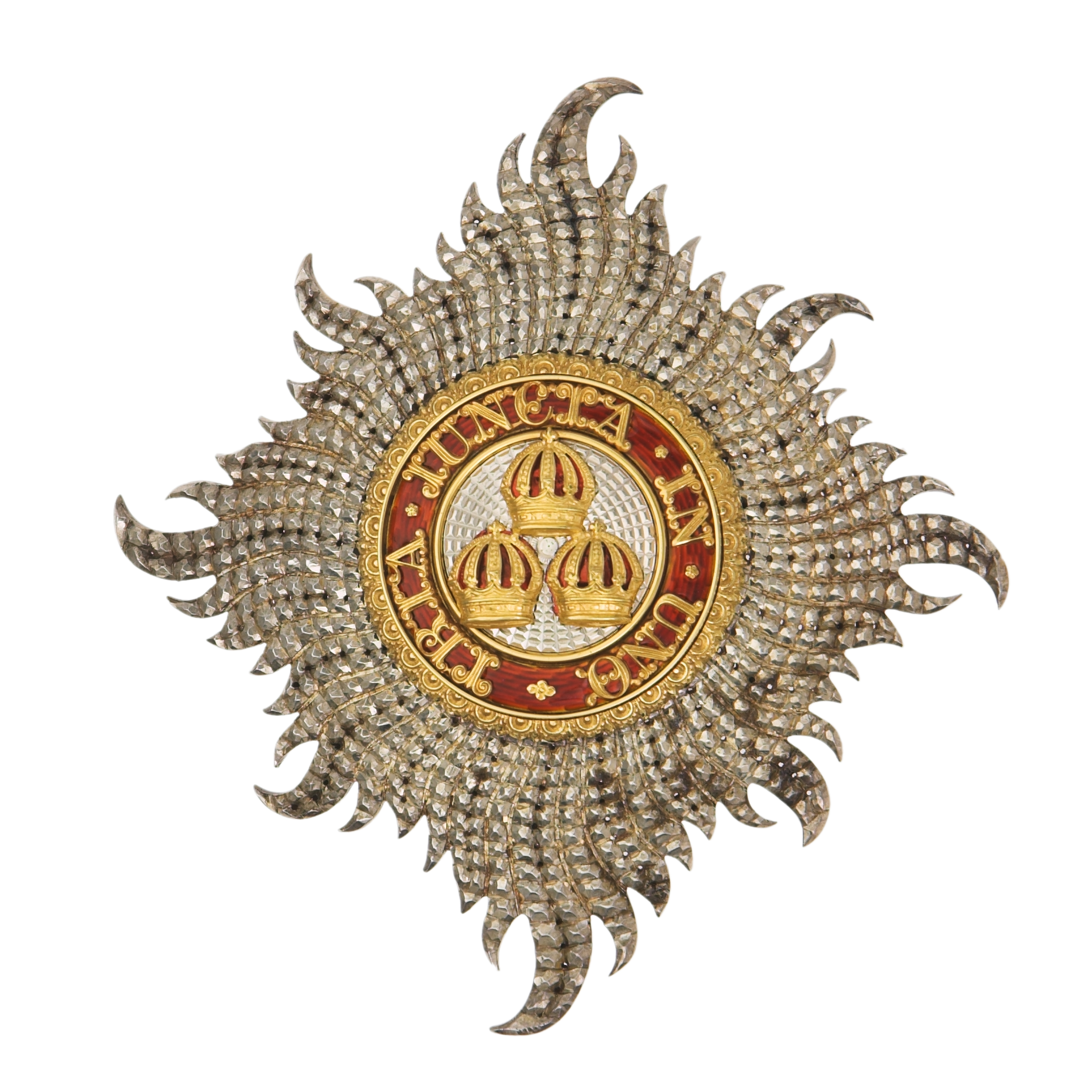
Civilian star of the Knight Grand Cross of the Order of the Bath

==== Knight Grand Cross of the Order of the Bath (KGCB) ====
Military Division

- General Sir Samuel James Browne KCB KCSI VC Indian Staff Corps.
- General Sir Charles Patton Keyes KCB Indian Staff Corps.
- General Sir John Ross KCB Commanding the Troops in the Dominion of Canada.
- Lt.-Gen. Sir John Chetham McLeod KCB
- Lt.-Gen. Sir Henry Evelyn Wood GCMG KCB VC Commanding the Troops, Aldershot.

==== Knight Commander of the Order of the Bath (KCB) ====
Military Division

- Admiral Sir Francis Leopold McClintock Kt RN
- General William Templer Hughes CB Indian Staff Corps.
- General Charles Robert Cureton CB Indian Staff Corps.
- General John Field CB Bombay Infantry.
- Vice-Admiral George Willes Watson RN Commander-in-Chief, North America and West Indies.
- Lt.-Gen. Charles Craufurd Fraser CB VC
- Lt.-Gen. Wilbraham Oates Lennox CB VC Royal Engineers.
- Lt.-Gen. William John Williams CB Royal Artillery.
- Major-General and Honorary Lt.-Gen. Henry Edwin Weare CB
- Maj.-Gen. and Honorary Lt.-Gen. Alexander Abercromby Nelson CB
- William Alexander Mackinnon CB, Director-General of the Army Medical Department
- Lt.-Col. and Col. (temporary Maj.-Gen.) Henry James Alderson CB Royal Artillery, Director of Artillery.

==== Companion of the Order of the Bath (CB) ====
Military Division

- Maj.-Gen. Thomas Rose Nimmo, Indian Staff Corps.
- Capt. Walter Stewart RN
- Col. (temporary Maj.-Gen.) Henry le Guay Geary, Commanding Royal Artillery, Southern District.
- Lt.-Col. and Col. the Hon. George Patrick Hyde Villiers CMG Grenadier Guards.
- Capt. Alan Brodrick Thomas RN
- Capt. Henry Coey Kane RN
- Lt.-Col. and Col. William Popham Dicken DSO Indian Staff Corps.
- Lt.-Col. and Col. Swinton John Browne, Indian Staff Corps.
- Lt.-Col. and Col. Francis William Boileau, Indian Staff Corps.
- Lt.-Col. and Col. Robert Cecil Richard Clifford, Indian Staff Corps.
- Lt.-Col. and Col. James Calder Stewart, Indian Staff Corps.
- Lt.-Col. and Col. Francis William Collis, Indian Staff Corps.
- Lt.-Col. and Col. Joseph Gabbett, Indian Staff Corps.
- Lt.-Col. and Col. Thomas Fraser CMG Royal Engineers.
- Col. James Alleyne, Assistant Adjutant-General, Aldershot.
- Lt.-Col. and Col. John Frederick Maurice, Professor, Staff College.
- Col. Henry Richard Abadie, Regimental District.
- Chief Inspector of Machinery John Harold Heffernan RN
- Col. James Woodward Scott ADC Royal Marine Light Infantry.
- Lt.-Col. and Col. Bindon Blood, Royal Engineers.
- Lt.-Col. and Col. Arthur Godolphin Yeatman-Biggs, Royal Artillery.
- Maj. and Brevet Col. Charles Holled Smith, the King's Royal Rifle Corps (Governor-General of the Red Sea Littoral and Commandant, Suakin).
- Lt.-Col. and Col. Richard Westmacott DSO Indian Staff Corps.
- Col. Arthur Singleton Wynne, Assistant Adjutant General, Curragh.
- Lt.-Col. and Col. Frederick Meyer Wardrop, 12th Lancers.
- Maj. and Col. John Hartley Sandwith, Royal Marine Light Infantry, Deputy Assistant Adjutant-General, Egypt.
- Maj. and Col. Charles Coghlan Smyth, the Welsh Regiment.
- Principal Veterinary Surgeon James Drummond Lambert, Veterinary Department.
- Col. William Gustavus Nicholson, Military Secretary to the Commander-in-Chief in India.
- Brigade Surgeon Robert Waters
- Lt.-Col. Arthur James Poole.
- Honorary Lt.-Col. Edmund Grey Skinner, Assistant Commissary General of Ordnance, Ordnance Store Department.
- Lt.-Col. Wodehouse Dillon Richardson, Army Service Corps, Deputy Assistant Adjutant-General, Egypt.

Civil Division

- Lt.-Col. and Col. Robert Young Armstrong, Royal Engineers, Inspector of Submarine Defences.
- Robert Giffen, Assistant Secretary, Board of Trade.
- Honorary Col. William Macdonnell, Chief Paymaster, Army Pay Department.
- Frederic Lacey Robinson, Commissioner of Inland Revenue.
- Guy Douglas Arthur Fleetwood Wilson, War Office.

=== The Most Exalted Order of the Star of India ===
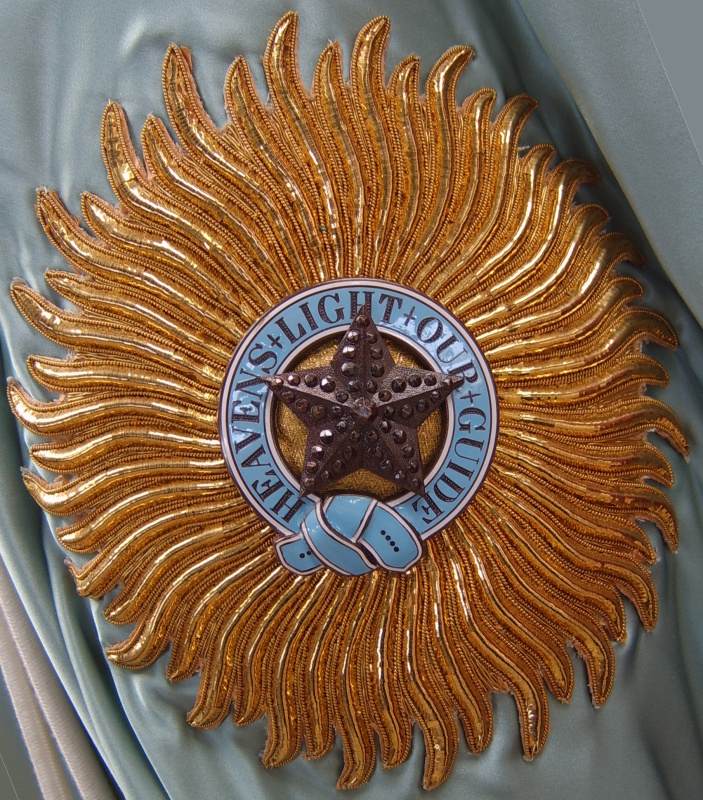
Star of a Knight Grand Commander of the Most Exalted Order of the Star of India.

==== Knight Commander (KCSI) ====
- Philip Perceval Hutchins CSI Madras Civil Service, Member of the Council of the Governor-General of India.

==== Companion (CSI) ====
- Col. George Herbert Trevor, Madras Staff Corps, Agent to the Governor-General in Rajputana.

=== The Most Distinguished Order of Saint Michael and Saint George ===
Star of the Order of Saint Michael and Saint George.

==== Knight Commander of the Order of St Michael and St George (KCMG) ====
- Richard Southey CMG formerly Colonial Secretary of the Colony of the Cape of Good Hope and Lieutenant-Governor of the Province of Griqualand West.
- John Forrest CMG Premier and Treasurer of the Colony of Western Australia.
- George William Robert Campbell CMG oil retirement from the office of Inspector-General of Police and Prisons of the Island of Ceylon.

==== Companion of the Order of St Michael and St George (CMG) ====
- William Grey-Wilson, Governor and Commander-in-Chief of the Island of St. Helena.
- Col. John Elliott CB Inspector-General of Police of the Island of Barbados.
- Thomas Dickson Foote, late President of the General Legislative Council of the Leeward Islands and of the Legislative Council of Antigua.
- Frederick Mitchell Hodgson, Colonial Secretary of the Gold Coast Colony.
- George Chardin Denton, Colonial Secretary of the Colony of Lagos.
- Lt.-Col. Alexander Chalmers McKean, for services in Zululand.
- Lt.-Col. David Wilson, Commanding the Rifle Volunteers in Trinidad, and Sub-intendant of Crown Lands of that Colony.
- Charles Shortt Dicken, Secretary to the Agent-General in London for the Colony of Queensland.
- Charles James Ward, for services in connection with the Jamaica Exhibition.
- George Stiebel, for services in connection with the Jamaica Exhibition.

Honorary Companion

- Dato Sri Amar d'Raja Abdul Rahman, Secretary to His Highness the Sultan of Johore GCMG KCSI

=== The Most Eminent Order of the Indian Empire ===
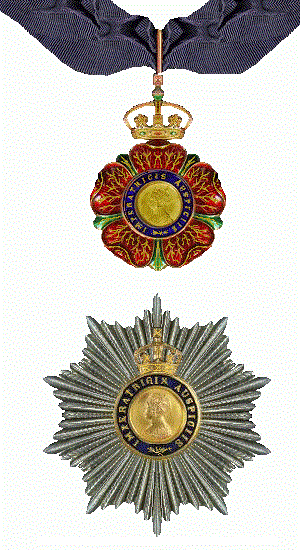
Riband, badge and star of the Knight Grand Commander of the Order of the Indian Empire

==== Knight Grand Commander (GCIE) ====
- His Highness Mir Ali Murad Khan, Talpur of Khairpur.

==== Knight Commander (KCIE) ====
- Charles Bradley Pritchard CSI Bombay Civil Service. Member of the Council of the Governor of Bombay.

==== Companion (CIE) ====
- Nawub Ahsun Ullah, of Dacca.
- John Prescott Hewett, Bengal Civil Service.
- Raj Kanti Chunder Mukarji Bahadur, Diwan of Jaipur.
- Dr. William Schlich
- Maharaja Mahendra Singh, of Bhadawar.
- Capt. Francis Edward Younghusband, 1st (King's) Dragoon Guards.
- Vincent Robinson.
- Khan Bahadur Muncherji Kavasji Murzban.

=== Distinguished Service Order (DSO) ===
- Chief Inspector of Machinery Henry Benbow RN
- Col. Elphinstone Waters Begbie, Madras Infantry, Assistant Adjutant-General, Madras.
- Maj. and Col. Francis William Rhodes, 1st Dragoon, Military Secretary to Governor, Bombay.
- Capt. and Brevet Lt.-Col. Ian Standish Monteith Hamilton, the Gordon Highlanders, Assistant Adjutant-General (for Musketry), Bengal.
- Maj. and Brevet Lt.-Col. Ralph Arthur Penrhyn Clements, the South Wales Borderers.
- Maj. and Brevet Lt.-Col. Henry Hamilton Settle, Royal Engineers (attached to Egyptian Army).
- Honorary Lt.-Col. Frank Graham Wintle, Assistant Commissary-General of Ordnance, Ordnance Store Department.
- Maj. and Brevet Lt.-Col. Harold Pemberton Leach, Royal Engineers.
- Surgeon-Maj. James Sutherland Wilkins, Indian Medical Service.
- Maj. Charles Comyn Egerton, Indian Staff Corps, Assistant Adjutant-General, Punjab Frontier Force.
- Maj. Alfred Mansel, Royal Artillery.
- Capt. William Richard Yielding, Indian Staff Corps.
- Capt. John Robert Beech CMG 20th Hussars (attached to Egyptian Army).
