= Christ Church, North Shields =

Coordinates: 55.011451°N 1.448102°W

- Christ Church, North Shields, Tyne and Wear
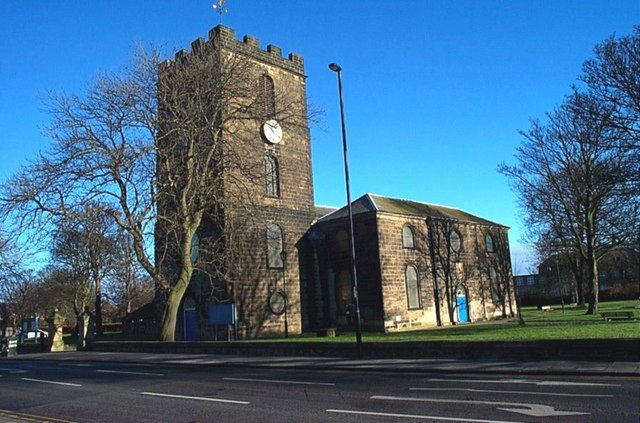
- Christ Church seen from the south west

- Location in Tyne and Wear
- OS grid reference: NZ 35395 68681
- Location: North Shields, Tyne and Wear
- Country: England
- Denomination: Anglican
- Website: About Christ Church

History
- Founded: 1654
- Dedication: Christ Church
- Consecrated: 5 July 1668

Architecture
- Heritage designation: Grade II
- Architect(s): Robert Trollope, John Dodds
- Architectural type: Church
- Style: Georgian architecture
- Groundbreaking: 1654
- Completed: 1793

Christ Church is a church North Shields, in the county of Tyne and Wear, England is an Anglican church in the parish of North Shields Christ Church, Diocese of Newcastle. It has been designated by English Heritage as a Grade II listed building,

== Early history ==
Christ Church was the first church to be built in North Shields, originally a small fishing village created by Prior Germanus of Tynemouth Priory in the thirteenth century. After the Dissolution of the Monasteries, the Priory's decaying church had been used for worship by Tynemouth and North Shields residents, but in the mid-seventeenth century a replacement was needed, and Christ Church was begun in 1654. The original architect of the church is not known, but in 1663 the Yorkshire architect Robert Trollope was engaged to complete it, and it was consecrated on 5 July 1668 by John Cosin, Bishop of Durham.

In 1786, the Newcastle builder and architect John Dodds began to add a west tower to the church; this was completed in 1788. In 1792–3, the whole of the rest of the church was rebuilt to Dodds's designs, thus obliterating the work of Trollope and his predecessor(s).

== Architecture ==
John Grundy and Grace McCombie describe Dodds's Christ Church as "less ambitious" than the contemporary All Saints Church, Newcastle upon Tyne. Dodds had submitted plans for All Saints, but it was David Stephenson whose designs were chosen.

=== Exterior ===
Christ Church was built of sandstone ashlar masonry, with a roof of Welsh slate. The battlemented three-storey west tower has a double-door, circular and round-headed windows and a belfry.

The nave comprises three bays. The central north and south bays have doors with large round windows above and ornamental fanlights; the other bays have round-headed windows. The apse at the east end forms the chancel, enlarged in 1869.

The piers and walls to the west and south of the church are Grade II listed buildings. The free-standing building with the hipped roof and windows similar to those in the church is the former vestry.

=== Interior ===
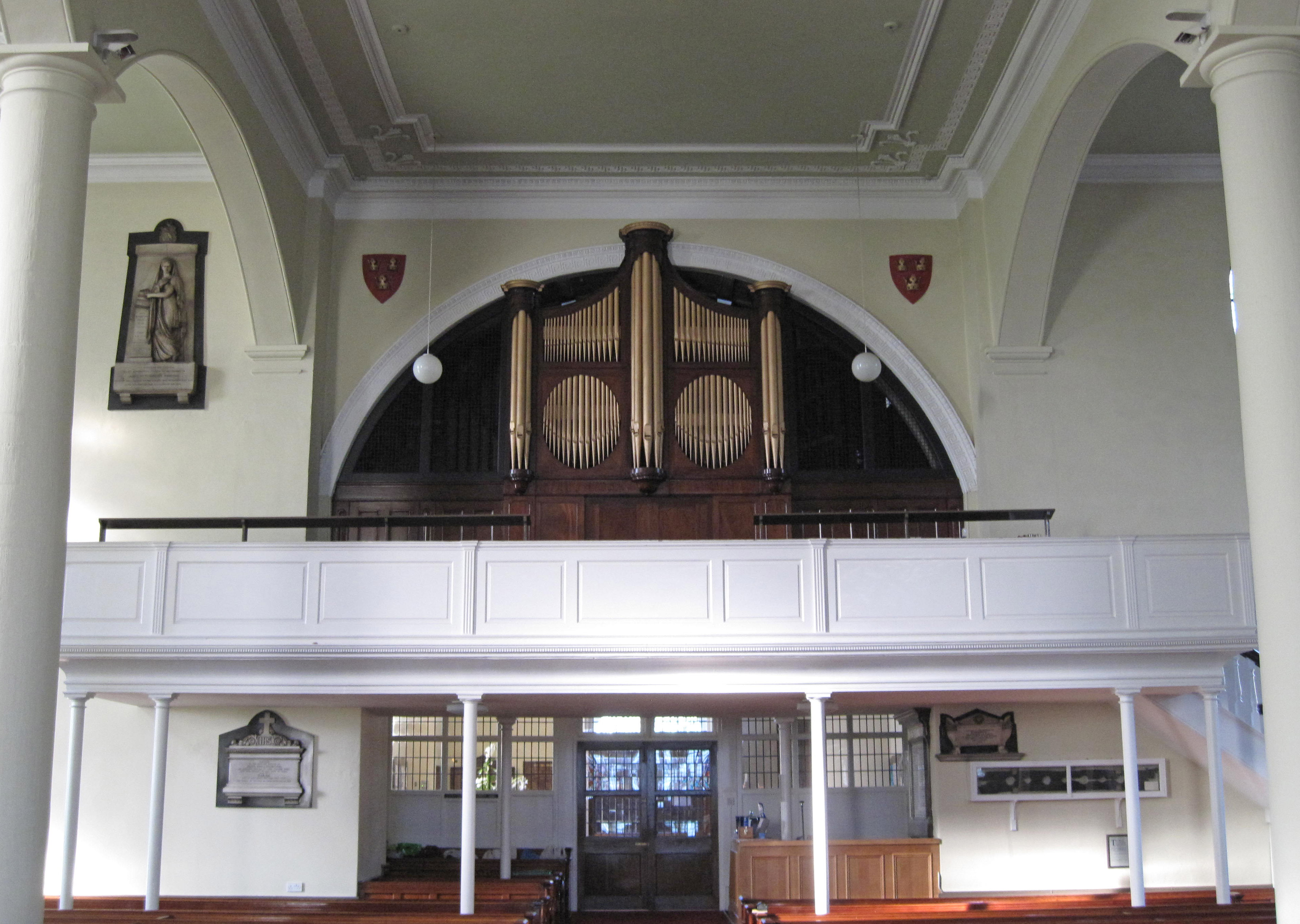
View of the west gallery and organ

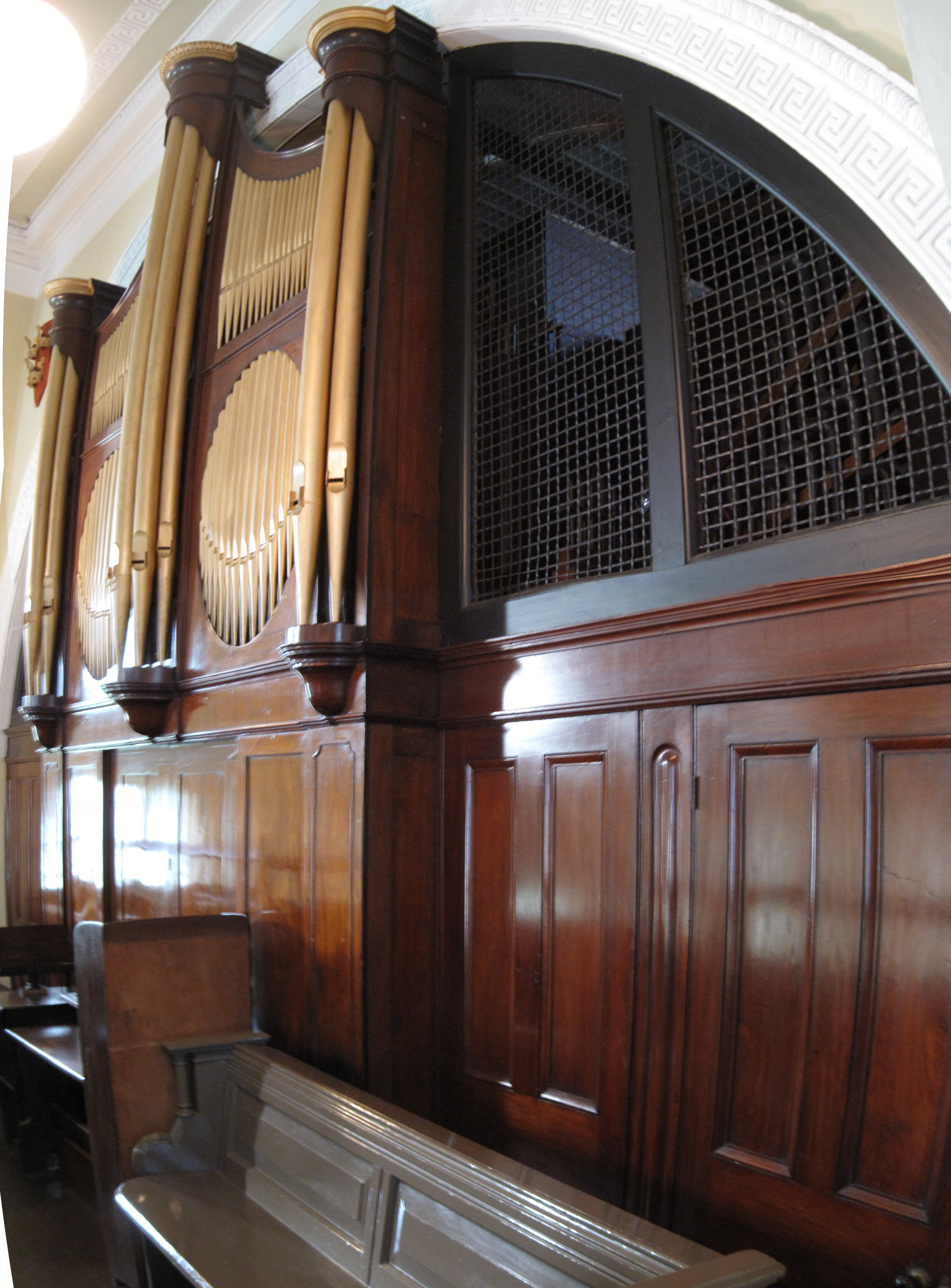
Close-up view of the organ and Calliope panelling

All of the nave's aisles are the same height as the rest of the church. The walls are plastered and the ceilings flat. The nave arcades have elliptical arches ("as shallow as Soane liked them") on thin Tuscan columns. The north and south galleries were removed during renovations to the church in 1951, but the west gallery, supported by cast iron columns, remains. In the gallery is the organ, previously in the chancel, now housed in a mahogany case including panels from the 1884 corvette HMS Calliope. In the south aisle is an eighteenth-century font.

== Monuments ==
Inside the church at the east end are two stone grave covers, commemorating a former vicar, Stephen Dockwray, who died in 1681, and members of the Howlett family, who died in 1683 and 1694. Outside, south of the church tower, is the Grade II chest tomb of Edward Hodgson, a cordwainer and one of the founders of the church, who died in 1690.
