= HMS Falcon (1899) =

Gipsy-class destroyer

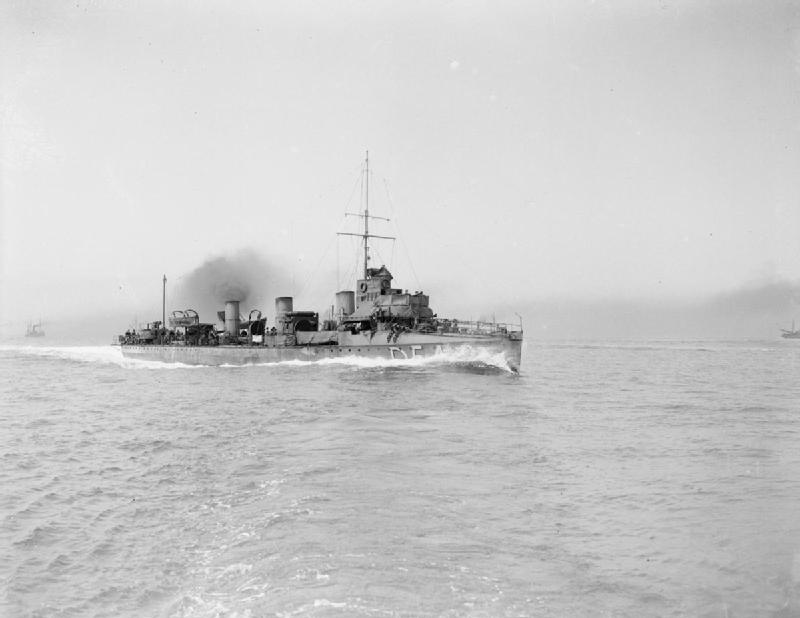
- Falcon before 1 January 1918

History

United Kingdom
- Name: Falcon
- Ordered: 1898 – 1899 Naval Estimates
- Builder: Fairfield Shipbuilding and Engineering Company, Govan
- Cost: £65,119
- Yard number: 412
- Laid down: 26 June 1899
- Launched: 29 December 1899
- Commissioned: December 1901
- Fate: Lost in collision with the armed trawler HMS John Fitzgerald, 1 April 1918

General characteristics
- Class & type: Fairfield three funnel, 30 knot destroyer
- Displacement: 370 long tons (376 t) light; 420 long tons (427 t) full load
- Length: 215 ft 6 in (65.68 m) o/a
- Beam: 21 ft (6.4 m)
- Draught: 8 ft 9 in (2.67 m)
- Installed power: 6,300 ihp (4,700 kW)
- Propulsion: 4 × Thornycroft water tube boilers; 2 × vertical triple-expansion steam engines; 2 shafts
- Speed: 30 kn (56 km/h)
- Range: 85 tons coal; 1,615 nmi (2,991 km) at 11 kn (20 km/h)
- Complement: 63 officers and men
- Armament: 1 × QF 12-pounder 12 cwt Mark I L/40 naval gun on a P Mark I low angle mount; 5 × QF 6-pdr 8 cwt L/40 naval gun on a Mark I* low angle mount; 2 × single tubes for 18-inch (450mm) torpedoes

HMS Falcon was a Fairfield three-funnel, 30 knot destroyer ordered by the Royal Navy under the 1898 – 1899 Naval Estimates. She spent her life in Home waters, was part of the Dover Patrol during World War I and was lost in a collision on 1 April 1918.

== Construction and career ==
She was laid down as yard number 412 on 26 June 1899 at the Fairfield Shipbuilding and Engineering Company shipyard at Govan, Glasgow and launched on 29 December 1899. During her builder's trials she made her contracted speed requirement. She was completed and accepted by the Royal Navy in December 1901.

She spent her operational career only in home waters operating with the Channel Fleet.

Falcon was commissioned at Devonport on 4 January 1902 and was assigned to the Channel Fleet to serve in the instructional flotilla at Portsmouth. Commander Roger Keyes was appointed in command, bringing the crew of the destroyer Bat, which previously served in the flotilla. She paid off at Devonport on 12 May 1902, when her crew transferred to the destroyer Sprightly, which was the following day commissioned for the instructional flotilla. She was recommissioned on 22 November to take the place of HMS Skate in the Devonport instructional flotilla, and received the crew from that ship.

On 11 April 1907 Falcon and the destroyer Colne collided in the Channel, badly damaging both ships. Falcon was under repair for almost three months. On 9 July 1907 Falcon towed the destroyer Violet back to the Nore after Violet was badly damaged in a collision with a sailing vessel.

On 30 August 1912 the Admiralty directed all destroyer classes were to be designated by alphabetic characters starting with the letter 'A'. Since her design speed was 30-knots and she had three funnels she was assigned to the C class. After 30 September 1913 she was known as a C-class destroyer and had the letter ‘C’ painted on the hull below the bridge area and on either the fore or aft funnel.

=== World War I ===
For the test mobilization in July 1914, she was assigned to the 6th Destroyer Flotilla based at Dover. While employed with the 6th Flotilla, she conducted counter-mining patrols escorted merchant ships and patrolled in defense of the Dover Barrage.

On 28 October 1914 while on anti-submarine patrol off the Belgian coast at Westende with Syren she came under heavy accurate artillery fire from the shore. She remained on station and returned fire until hit by an 8-inch shell which killed 8 personnel including her commanding officer and wounded 15. She was brought into Dunkirk and repaired. She was awarded the battle honour "Belgian Coast 1914 – 17" for her service.

On 1 April 1918, while on convoy duty in the North Sea and under the command of C.H. Lightoller, she was rammed and sunk by the armed trawler HMS John Fitzgerald

== Pennant numbers ==
Pennant number	From	To
P31	6 Dec 1914	1 Sep 1915
D54	1 Sep 1915	1 Jan 1918
D36	1 Jan 1918	1 Apr 1918

== Bibliography ==
- Chesneau, Roger & Kolesnik, Eugene M., eds. (1979). Conway's All The World's Fighting Ships 1860–1905. London: Conway Maritime Press. ISBN 0-85177-133-5.
- Colledge, J. J.; Warlow, Ben (2006) [1969]. Ships of the Royal Navy: The Complete Record of All Fighting Ships of the Royal Navy from the 15th Century to the Present (3rd Rev ed.). London: Chatham Publishing. ISBN 978-1-86176-281-8. OCLC 67375475.
- Corbett, Julian S. (1920). History of the Great War: Naval Operations: Vol. I: To the Battle of the Falklands. London: Longmans, Green and Co.
- Dittmar, F. J. & Colledge, J. J. (1972). British Warships 1914–1919. Shepperton, UK: Ian Allan. ISBN 0-7110-0380-7.
- Friedman, Norman (2009). British Destroyers: From Earliest Days to the Second World War. Barnsley, UK: Seaforth Publishing. ISBN 978-1-84832-049-9.
- Gardiner, Robert & Gray, Randal, eds. (1985). Conway's All The World's Fighting Ships 1906–1921. London: Conway Maritime Press. ISBN 0-85177-245-5.
- Jane, Fred T. (1969) [1898]. Jane's All the World's Fighting Ships 1898. New York: first published by Sampson Low Marston, London 1898, Reprinted ARCO Publishing Company.
- Jane, Fred T. (1990) [1919]. Jane's Fighting Ships of World War I. Jane’s Publishing. ISBN 1-85170-378-0.
- Lyon, David (2001) [1996]. The First Destroyers. London: Caxton Editions. ISBN 1-84067-3648.
- Manning, T. D. (1961). The British Destroyer. London: Putnam & Co. OCLC 6470051.
- March, Edgar J. (1966). British Destroyers: A History of Development, 1892–1953; Drawn by Admiralty Permission From Official Records & Returns, Ships' Covers & Building Plans. London: Seeley Service. OCLC 164893555.
