= Baron Keyes =

Barony in the Peerage of the United Kingdom

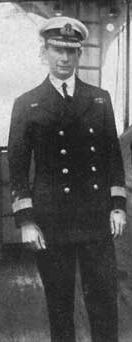
Roger Keyes, 1st Baron Keyes

Baron Keyes, of Zeebrugge, and Dover in the County of Kent, is a title in the Peerage of the United Kingdom. It was created in 1943 for the prominent naval commander Admiral of the Fleet Sir Roger Keyes, 1st Baronet. He is chiefly remembered for his role in the Zeebrugge Raid in 1918, an attempt by the Royal Navy to neutralize the Belgian port of Zeebrugge which was used as a base for German submarine attacks on Allied shipping. Keyes had already been created a Baronet, of Zeebrugge, and of Dover in the County of Kent, in the Baronetage of the United Kingdom in 1919. As of 2010 the titles are held by his grandson, the third Baron, who succeeded his father in 2005. He does not use his title.

Geoffrey Charles Tasker Keyes, eldest son of the first Baron, was killed in 1941 during an attempt to capture General Erwin Rommel in Libya. For his actions, Keyes was posthumously awarded the Victoria Cross.

== Barons Keyes (1943) ==
- Roger John Brownlow Keyes, 1st Baron Keyes (1872–1945)
- Roger George Bowlby Keyes, 2nd Baron Keyes (1919–2005)
- Charles William Packe Keyes, 3rd Baron Keyes (b. 1951).

The heir presumptive is the present holder's brother the Hon. Leopold Roger John Keyes (b. 1956)

Coat of arms of Baron Keyes
Crest An open hand couped at the wrist Proper holding between the forefinger and thumb a key Or. Escutcheon Per chevron Gules and Sable three keys Or the wards of the two in chief facing each other and of the one in base to the sinister. On a canton argent a lion rampant of the first. Supporters Dexter a sailor of the Royal Navy in his working rig Proper supporting in the exterior hand a staff Argent ensigned with a naval crown Or and flying the banner of St George also Proper. Sinister a Royal Marin in field service dress armed and equipped for trench raiding all Proper. Motto Virtute Adepta
