= HMS Sprightly (1900) =

Destroyer of the Royal Navy

History

United Kingdom
- Name: HMS Sprightly
- Builder: Laird, Son & Co., Birkenhead
- Laid down: 20 June 1899
- Launched: 25 September 1900
- Completed: March 1902
- Fate: Scrapped, 1920

General characteristics
- Class & type: Lively-class destroyer
- Displacement: 385 long tons (391 t)
- Length: 219 ft (67 m)
- Beam: 21.25 ft (6.5 m)
- Draught: 8 ft 7 in (2.6 m)
- Propulsion: Vertical triple-expansion steam engines; Coal-fired Normand boilers; 6,250 hp (4,661 kW)
- Speed: 30 knots (56 km/h; 35 mph)
- Armament: 1 × QF 12-pounder gun; 5 × 6-pounder guns; 2 × 18 inch (450 mm) torpedo tubes

HMS Sprightly was a B-class torpedo boat destroyer of the British Royal Navy. She was built speculatively by Laird, Son & Company, Birkenhead, pre-empting further orders for vessels of this type, and was purchased by the navy in 1901.

== Construction ==
Sprightly arrived at Plymouth from Birkenhead in late November 1901 for tests and fitting of navy equipment. She was placed in the B division of the Fleet Reserve at Devonport in late March 1902.

In 1912 the Admiralty directed all destroyers were to be grouped into classes designated by letters based on appearance. to provide some system to the naming of HM destroyers. "30 knotter" vessels with 4 funnels, were classified by the Admiralty as the B-class, the 3-funnelled, "30 knotters" became the C-class and the 2-funnelled ships the D-class). As a 4 funnel vessel Sprightly became a B-class.

== Operational history ==
Sprightly was commissioned at Devonport by Commander Roger Keyes on 13 May 1902, with the crew of the destroyer Falcon, taking that ship's place in the instructional flotilla. She took part in the fleet review held at Spithead on 16 August 1902 for the coronation of King Edward VII.

== Bibliography ==
- Brassey, T. A., ed. (1898). The Naval Annual 1898. Portsmouth, UK: J Griffin and Co.
- Chesneau, Roger & Kolesnik, Eugene M., eds. (1979). Conway's All The World's Fighting Ships 1860–1905. London: Conway Maritime Press. ISBN 0-85177-133-5.
- Colledge, J. J.; Warlow, Ben (2006) [1969]. Ships of the Royal Navy: The Complete Record of All Fighting Ships of the Royal Navy from the 15th Century to the Present (3rd Rev ed.). London: Chatham Publishing. ISBN 978-1-86176-281-8. OCLC 67375475.
- Dittmar, F.J.; Colledge, J.J. (1972). British Warships 1914–1919. Shepperton, UK: Ian Allan. ISBN 0-7110-0380-7.
- Friedman, Norman (2009). British Destroyers: From Earliest Days to the Second World War. Barnsley, UK: Seaforth Publishing. ISBN 978-1-84832-049-9.
- Gardiner, Robert & Gray, Randal, eds. (1985). Conway's All The World's Fighting Ships 1906–1921. London: Conway Maritime Press. ISBN 0-85177-245-5.
- Lyon, David (2001) [1996]. The First Destroyers. London: Caxton Editions. ISBN 1-84067-3648.
- Manning, T. D. (1961). The British Destroyer. London: Putnam & Co. OCLC 6470051.
- March, Edgar J. (1966). British Destroyers: A History of Development, 1892–1953; Drawn by Admiralty Permission From Official Records & Returns, Ships' Covers & Building Plans. London: Seeley Service. OCLC 164893555.
