= Calliope Dock =

Dry dock in Auckland

Coordinates: 36.830241°S 174.786236°E

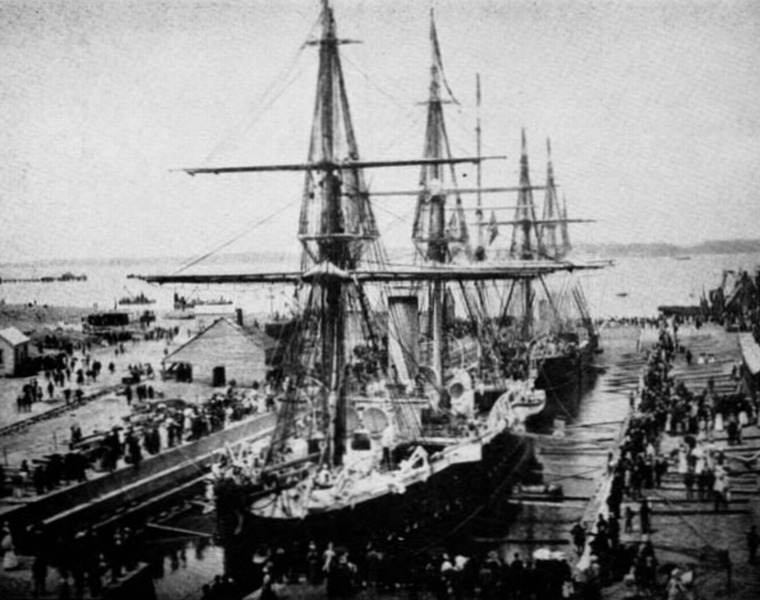
Royal Navy steam-and-sail corvettes HMS Calliope and HMS Diamond in the dock during opening festivities 1888.

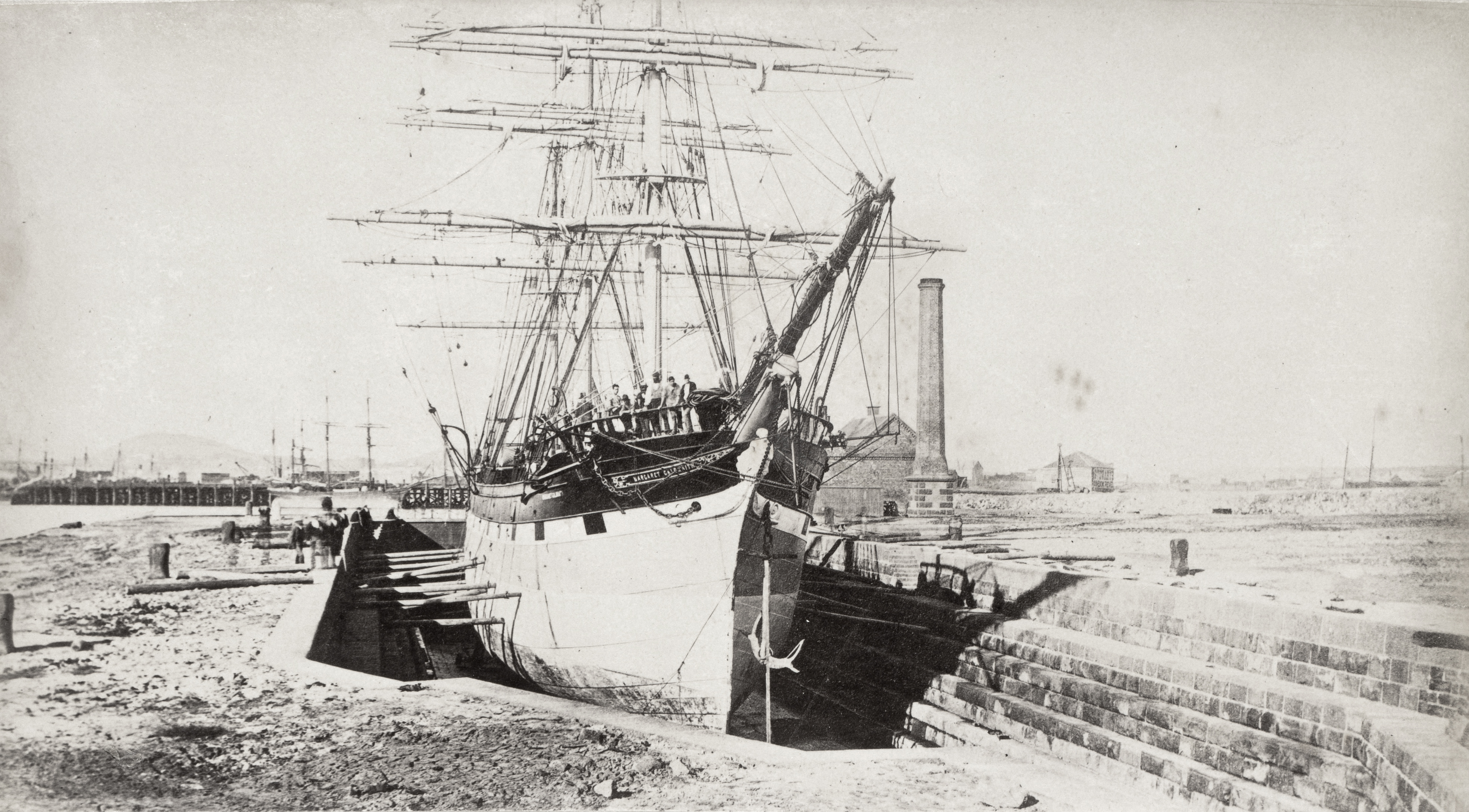
Margaret Galbraith (the first ship to enter the Auckland graving dock,) Auckland, New Zealand, 1878

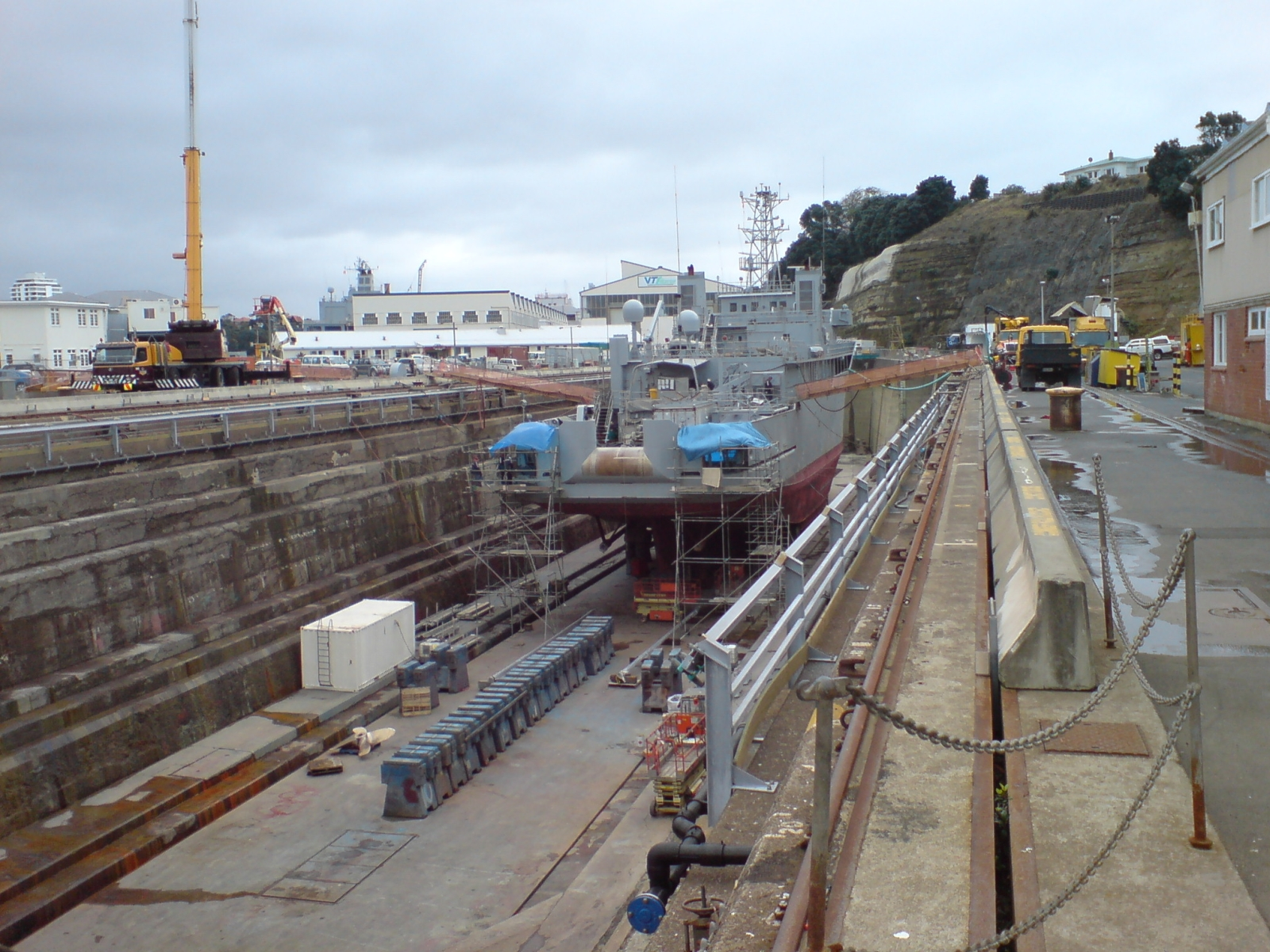
Survey ship HMNZS Resolution of the Royal New Zealand Navy in the dock in 2008.

The Calliope Dock is a historical stone dry dock on the grounds of the Devonport Naval Base, in Devonport, Auckland, New Zealand. It was built in 1888 to service ships of the British Royal Navy, and is still in use today.

As built it measured 525 ft (160 m) by 110 ft (34 m), narrowing to 80 ft (24 m) at the gate. The water on the sill was 33 ft (10 m) deep. It was extended in 1936, 1943 (to 185 m (607 ft)) and again in 1996.

== History ==
After it was found that the Auckland Graving Dock on the Auckland waterfront was too small to be an effective dry dock, work on the Calliope Dock began in December 1884, taking over three years to complete. Among the 300 labourers who constructed the dock, many were Māori, and whare were constructed to the west of the dock as a temporary village. The structure required 1.5 million bricks, which were made locally.

The dock was officially opened in February 1888. At the time of its construction, it was the largest in the Southern Hemisphere, and a strategic asset for the Royal Navy. It was named for Calliope Point, out of which it had been hewn by hand over three years. Coincidentally, one of the two first ships to enter it (as a show of her capacity) was HMS Calliope. Administered at first by the Auckland Harbour Board, by 1899 the dock and wharf had become underused and needed widescale maintenance. The Board struck a deal with the Royal Navy for primary use of the dock. This led to the Auckland naval base moving from Torpedo Bay to Devonport, into a swamp area next to the dock.

After World War I, the Royal Navy expanded the facilities in the area, including work to extend the dock and create more workshops to service the fleet. On 26 February 1987, the Royal New Zealand Navy (the successor to the Royal Navy in New Zealand) purchased the dock from the Harbour Board for $650,000.
