= Terence Keyes =

British Army general (1877–1939)

Brigadier-General Sir Terence Keyes KCIE CSI CMG FRGS FZS
- Born: 28 May 1877
- Died: 26 February 1939 (aged 61); Hastings, East Sussex
- Military career
- Allegiance: United Kingdom
- Branch: Indian Army
- Service years: 1897–1932
- Rank: Brigadier-General
- Conflicts: Tirah Expedition; First World War; Russian Civil War
- Awards: Knight Commander of the Order of the Indian Empire; Companion of the Order of the Star of India; Companion of the Order of St Michael and St George; Mentioned in Despatches (4); Officer of the Order of the Crown (Romania); Order of Saint Anna, 1st Class (Russia); Order of Saint Stanislaus, 1st Class (Russia); Order of Saint Vladimir, 4th Class (Russia)

Brigadier-General Sir Terence Humphrey Keyes, KCIE, CSI, CMG, FRGS, FZS (28 May 1877 – 26 February 1939) was a British officer in the Indian Army and the Indian Political Service.

== Early life and family ==
Keyes was born on 28 May 1877. He was the son of General Sir Charles Keyes, the younger brother of Admiral of the Fleet Lord Keyes and older brother of Commander Adrian Keyes, who served with distinction during the Gallipoli campaign. He was educated at Haileybury College and as Queen's India Cadet at the Royal Military College, Sandhurst, from which he was commissioned second lieutenant in the Indian Army in January 1897.

== Military career ==
Keyes served in the Tirah Expedition in 1897–1898, attached to the 2nd Battalion, King's Own Scottish Borderers, where he was slightly wounded in the hand by a splinter and hit by a spent bullet in the chest at the Battle of Chagru Kotal on 18 October 1897. He was mentioned in despatches for these operations, and promoted lieutenant in April 1899. In 1900 he served with troops helping to relieve the famine in the Central Provinces.

In October 1904, he received his first political post when he was appointed vice-consul in Seistan and Kain in Persia. He was promoted captain in January 1906, and in February he became consul in Turbat-i-Haidari and Karez, also in Persia. He served in the Baluchistan Campaign in 1908 and in 1914 was appointed political agent in Bahrain. Promoted major in 1915, he served in the Mesopotamian campaign during the First World War. In 1916, he headed the Mekran Mission, for which he was appointed Companion of the Order of the Indian Empire (CIE) in June 1917. In 1917 he was attached to the Russian army in Romania, was promoted temporary lieutenant-colonel in January 1918, and brevet lieutenant-colonel in June. For the next two years, he served on "special duty" in Russia during the revolution. He served in the Russian Civil War in 1919–1920, serving as Brigadier-General General Staff South Russia and Army of the Black Sea from December 1919 to June 1920, and being mentioned in despatches three times and appointed Companion of the Order of St Michael and St George (CMG) in November 1919. From 1919 to 1920, he served as deputy high commissioner and acting high commissioner in South Russia. For his war service he also received several foreign orders: Officer of the Order of the Crown of Romania with Swords, Order of St Anna 1st Class, Order of St Stanislaus 1st Class, and Order of St Vladimir with Swords 4th Class, all Russian.

After the war he returned to India, serving in Baluchistan again from 1921 to 1928, for which he was appointed Companion of the Order of the Star of India (CSI) in 1928. He was promoted substantive lieutenant-colonel in January 1923. In 1928, he was appointed British envoy at the court of Nepal; from 1928 to 1929, he was British resident in Gwalior; in 1929, he was agent to the Governor-General in the princely states of Western India; and from 1930 to 1933, he was resident in Hyderabad. A school in Secunderabad, the Keyes High School for Girls, was named after him, as he helped Dewan Padma Rao Mudaliar secure land to establish a permanent home for a school established by Venu Gopal Pillai that had six dispersed campuses. He retired from the army in May 1932 with the honorary rank of brigadier-general, and the following year returned to England to live at Freezeland Farm, near Ninfield, Sussex. He was appointed Knight Commander of the Order of the Indian Empire (KCIE) shortly before his retirement from the IPS in the 1933 New Year Honours.

== Personal and later life ==
He married Edith Beatrice M'Mahon, daughter of Lieutenant-General C. A. M'Mahon. They had three sons, Roger (who became a well-known BBC journalist), Patrick and Michael, and two daughters, Rosemary and Lavender. Keyes was a committed Christian and a supporter of the Oxford Group and its principles of "moral rearmament", as well as an active freemason, serving as the Master of Lodge Ekram at St. John's Masocic Hall during his stay at Secunderabad in 1931 He died in hospital in Hastings on 26 February 1939 after a long illness.
