= Henry Settle =

Lieutenant-General Sir Henry Settle KCB DSO
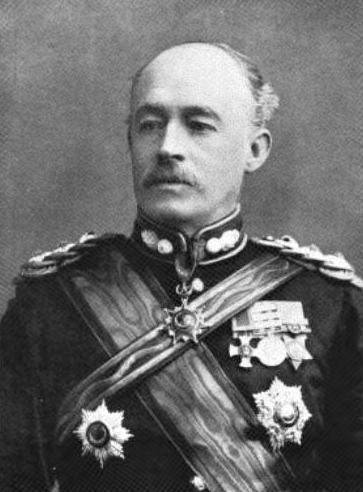
- Photograph of Settle in The Sketch, 1 May 1901
- Born: 27 January 1847; Southover, Lewes, England
- Died: 22 April 1923 (aged 76) Bath, Somerset, England
- Allegiance: United Kingdom
- Branch: British Army
- Rank: Lieutenant-General
- Conflicts: Mahdist War; Nile Expedition; Second Boer War
- Awards: Knight Commander of the Order of the Bath, Distinguished Service Order, Mentioned in Dispatches

Lieutenant-General Sir Henry Hamilton Settle, KCB, DSO (27 January 1847 – 22 April 1923) was a senior British Army officer who held various commands during the Second Boer War.

== Life and career ==
Settle was born in 1847, the second son of Captain H T Settle. He was educated at Cheltenham College before commissioning into the Royal Engineers in 1867. He first saw active service in the Nile Expedition of 1884–5, when he took part in operations in Sudan, being Mentioned in Dispatches and promoted brevet major. From 1886 to 1892, Settle filled the post of Surveyor General and Quarter Master General of the Egyptian Army. During this time he fought in the Mahdist War, being present at the Battle of Suakin. For his services he received two further mentions in dispatches, and was promoted brevet Lieutenant Colonel and awarded the Distinguished Service Order. In 1892 he was appointed Inspector General of Egyptian Police, and three years later returned to England to take up the appointment of Assistant Inspector General of Fortifications. In 1898 he was created a Companion of the Order of the Bath.

=== Second Boer War ===
For a few months in 1899 he commanded the Royal Engineers at Malta, whence he was called in October to take part in the Second Boer War. He was initially appointed Inspector General of Lines of Communication, stationed at Cape Town, with the temporary rank of brigadier-general from 3 March 1900. In early 1900 he was appointed to command the troops stationed in the Orange River Colony, where he arrived on 14 February. Lord Roberts quickly ordered three small columns to be formed by Settle, to check the course of the rebellion in Cape Colony. Settle himself took the right column to cut off Liebenberg. One of the other two columns however was repulsed, and Kitchener was sent to take command of the operations with strong reinforcements. His plan was the same as Settle's, who joined him in Prieska on 21 March 1900, and was given the task of bringing to order the rebels left in the outlying districts south of the Orange River. In this he was successful, and when he reached Upington, on 3 April, there was nothing to do but to arrange for the policing of the disaffected districts. Settle then returned to Cape Town to resume his work as Inspector General of Lines of Communication.

In September 1900, Settle, in co-operation with General Methuen, was ordered from Vryburg to relieve Schweizer Reneke. He entered the town unopposed, and then in October he was ordered to the Orange Free State. Kitchener adopted his recommendation that martial law should be at once proclaimed in Cape Colony, and ordered Settle to take command on the line of communications between De Aar and Naauwpoort. At the end of December, Settle, in command of four columns, pursued Hertzog who was forced back to the north east. In Kitchener's plan of the following February against Hetzog and De Wet, Settle was entrusted with the duty of giving all orders for moves to the fifteen columns engaged. In April, he was transferred to the western part of the Colony to organise resistance to some rebel bands under Maritz and Conroy. In May 1901, he left South Africa on temporary leave of absence and the huge territory he had controlled was split into four. At the end of October, Settle returned and, after an enquiry into the administration of martial law and a short term of command at De Aar, succeeded in December 1901 to the administrative command of Cape Colony in succession to Major General Wynne. For his services in the war, he was twice mentioned in dispatches (included by Lord Kitchener 23 June 1902), appointed a Knight Commander of the Order of the Bath (KCB) on 29 November 1900 (invested by King Edward VII at Marlborough House on 25 July 1901), and promoted to the rank of major-general, for distinguished service, in the South Africa Honours list published on 26 June 1902. The war ended with the Peace of Vereeniging on 31 May 1902, but Settle stayed in South Africa, in command of the troops in Cape Colony.

Following his return to the United Kingdom, he was appointed in command of the Portsmouth Coast Defences, and on 11 April 1908 promoted to lieutenant-general.

He died at his home in Bath on 22 April 1923.
