= Charles Patton Keyes =

British Indian Army general (1822–1896)

Sir Charles Keyes
- Born: 25 November 1822
- Died: 5 February 1896 (aged 73)
- Relatives: Roger Keyes (son); Phyllis Marion Keyes (daughter); Terence Keyes (son); Geoffrey Keyes (grandson)
- Military career
- Allegiance: United Kingdom
- Branch: (British Raj) British Indian Army
- Service years: 1843-1891
- Rank: General
- Commands: 1st Punjab Infantry; Queen's Own Corps of Guides; Punjab Field Force; 9th (Secunderabad) Division
- Awards: Knight Grand Cross of the Order of the Bath

General Sir Charles Patton Keyes, GCB, JP (25 November 1822 – 5 February 1896) was a British Indian Army officer.

== Career ==
He was commissioned into the 30th Madras Native Infantry in 1843, and was promoted to the rank of captain in 1858. He served as commanding officer of the 1st Punjab Infantry, Queen's Own Corps of Guides, Punjab Field Force and the 9th (Secunderabad) Division. He latterly served with the Indian Staff Corps. Keyes was promoted to major-general in 1881 and General in 1889. He was made Knight Grand Cross of the Order of the Bath in the 1891 Birthday Honours. In retirement he held the office of Justice of the Peace for Kent.

== Family ==
Keyes was the son of Thomas Keyes and Mary Anne Patton. He married Katherine Jessie Norman, daughter of Sir James Norman (and sister of Henry Wylie Norman), on 12 January 1870. Together they had nine children:

- Katherine Mary Keyes (died July 1956)
- Phyllis Marion Keyes (died 1 May 1968)
- Norman Keyes
- Admiral Roger John Brownlow Keyes, 1st Baron Keyes (4 October 1872 – 26 December 1945), father of Geoffrey Keyes
- Dorothea Agnes Keyes (8 July 1874 – 2 April 1962)
- Charles Valentine Keyes (14 February 1876 – 1901)
- Sir Terence Humphrey Keyes (28 May 1877 – 26 February 1939)
- Adrian St. Vincent Keyes (19 December 1882 – 6 October 1926)
- Madeline Helen Keyes (1886-25 April 1964)

Following her husband's death, Lady Keyes was in 1902 granted use of a set of apartments in Clock Tower, Hampton Court Palace, by King Edward VII.

== Arms ==
Coat of arms of Charles Patton Keyes
Notes Granted by John Bernard Burke, Ulster King of Arms, 29 November 1867. Crest An open hand couped at the wrist Proper holding between the forefinger and thumb a key Or. Escutcheon Per chevron Gules and Sable three keys Or the wards of the two in chief facing each other and of the one in base to the sinister on a canton Argent a lion rampant of the first. Motto Virtute Adepta
