= Phyllis Keyes =

British studio potter (1881–1968)

Phyllis Marion Keyes (1881–1968) was a studio potter associated with Duncan Grant, Vanessa Bell and the Bloomsbury group. She provided blank thrown pottery for Grant to decorate, many of these pots are on display at Charleston Farmhouse.

== Biography & Career ==
She was the daughter of General Sir Charles Patton Keyes and Katherine Jessie Norman.

In 1922 Keyes established Tingewick Pottery to produce lamps commissioned by Sibyl Colefax of Colefax and Fowler.

In the early 1930s Keyes had studios in Warren Street and later Clipstone Street London, supplying jugs and vases for decoration, they were typically marked with crossed keys and the initial “P”. She worked with the sculptor Stephen Tomlin, who designed pieces that she executed and also assisted her in her pottery. It is thought that Tomlin introduced her to members of the Bloomsbury group.

In 1991 a tin-glazed pottery cup and saucer thrown by Keyes and decorated by Duncan Grant sold at Christie's for £1320.

The Imperial War Museum holds a 1919 watercolour painting by Keyes called WRNS Dockworker.

The V&A museum holds an earthenware urn and a wall bracket designed by Stephen Tomlin in its permanent collection. The National Trust holds her work in Monks House, Rodmell, East Sussex the home of Virginia Woolf. Manchester Art Gallery has a footed bowl Keyes made in 1933.
