= Guy Fleetwood Wilson =

British public servant (1850–1940)

The Right Honourable Sir Guy Fleetwood Wilson
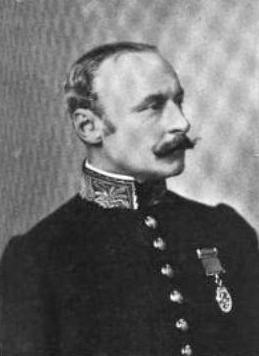
- Fleetwood Wilson in 1901
- Born: Guy Douglas Arthur Fleetwood Wilson; 21 October 1850; Florence, Italy
- Died: 24 December 1940 (aged 90); Stratford-upon-Avon, England
- Occupation: Public servant

Sir Guy Douglas Arthur Fleetwood Wilson GCIE KCB KCMG PC (also Fleetwood-Wilson; 21 October 1850 – 24 December 1940) was a British public servant. A finance specialist, he spent the bulk of his career in the War Office, before serving as Finance Member of the Viceroy's Council in India.

== Biography ==
Fleetwood Wilson was born and raised in Florence, Italy, where he was known as Guido, a name that stuck with him throughout his life. He was the son of Captain Thomas Hugh Fleetwood Wilson of the 8th Hussars, who served as Lieutenant-Governor of Barbados, and Harriet Horatia Walker, daughter of Capt. Charles Montagu Walker of the Royal Naval. He joined the Home Civil Service as a clerk in the Postmaster General's Department in 1870, then became private secretary to Sir Charles Wilson in Egypt in 1876. Transferring to the War Office in 1883, he was private secretary to several Secretaries of State, and became the first director-general of army finance in 1904. In 1907, he went to India as finance member of the council of the governor-general of India.

He was knighted in 1902, sworn in as a Privy Counsellor in 1914, and was appointed a Knight Commander of the Order of the Bath in 1905, Knight Commander of the Order of St Michael and St George 1908, and a Knight Grand Commander of the Order of the Indian Empire in 1911.

In 1922, he published a memoir of his correspondence, Letters to Somebody: A Retrospect.

He was a devoted reader of The Times, and wrote to the newspaper in 1932:

You cannot have many readers who have read The Times since 1855. I was born and passed my childhood in Florence and had to learn English. In that year, on my fifth birthday, my father called me into his study and told me that he would allow me to read one or two paragraphs of The Times to him. I felt highly honoured and when he died I continued the practice with my mother. The Times became a sort of family Bible with me. Since then, and up to now, I have rarely missed my daily reading of The Times. and I have made a practice of reading the back numbers which I may have been obliged to neglect for a time. I received and read The Times every day when I was in Egypt with the Financial mission, in 1873. I did the same when I was in South Africa with Kitchener during the Boer War, and in India The Times was stitched and ironed as was the practice in most clubs at that time. The six numbers came out to me regularly once a week and I never missed one; always reading them from the earliest number onwards. Since then I have never missed reading The Times daily.

— Sir Guy Fleetwood Wilson, January 1932

He died in Stratford-upon-Avon on 24 December 1940, aged 90.
