= William Alexander Mackinnon (British Army officer) =

Surgeon-General Sir William Alexander Mackinnon KCB
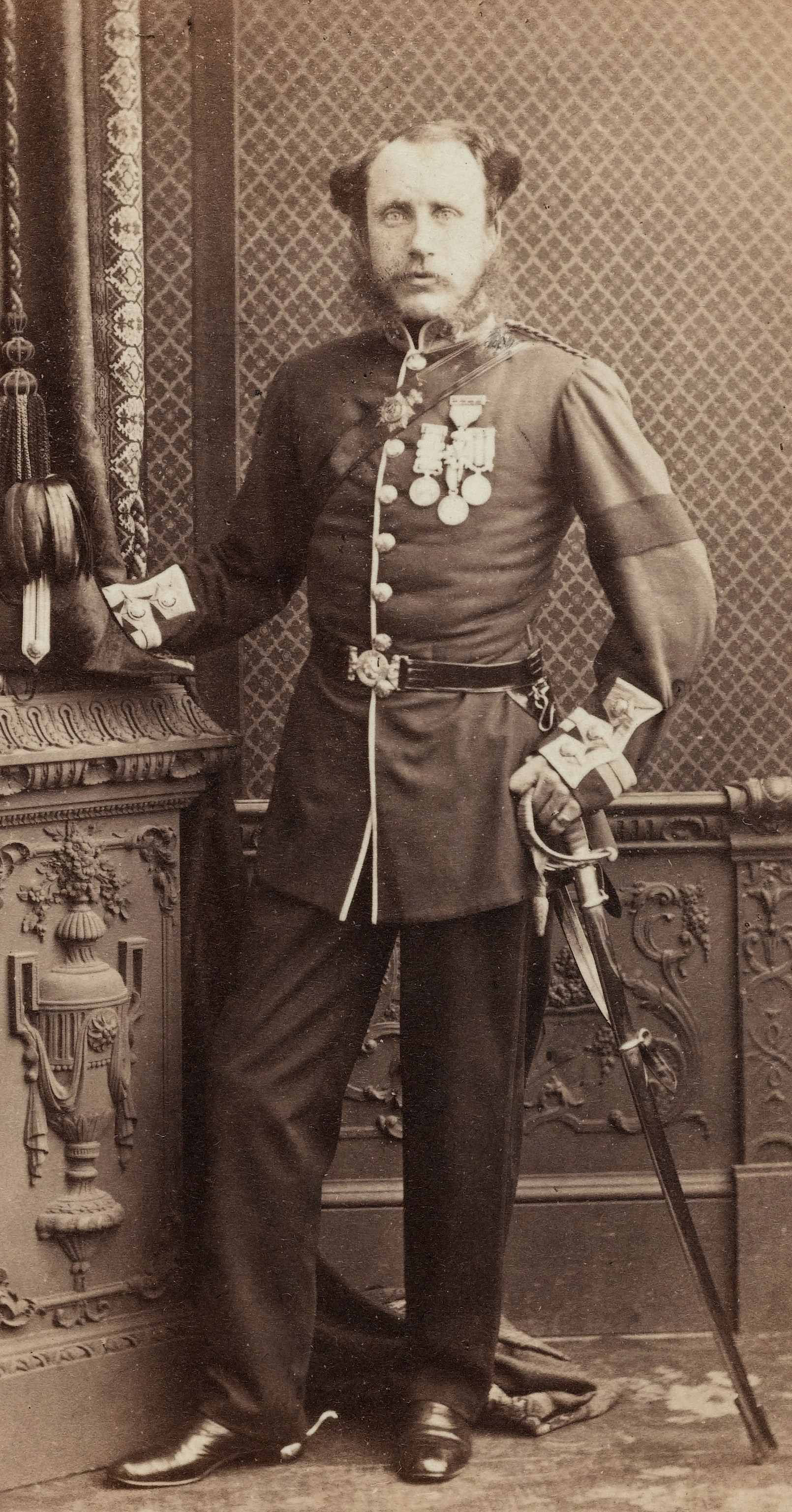
- Mackinnon in the 1880s
- Born: 27 June 1830; Skye, Scotland
- Died: 28 October 1897 (aged 67); London, England
- Military career
- Allegiance: United Kingdom
- Branch: British Army
- Service years: 1853–1896
- Rank: Surgeon-General
- Unit: 42nd Regiment of Foot
- Commands: Director General Army Medical Services
- Conflicts: Crimean War; New Zealand Wars; Third Anglo-Ashanti War
- Awards: Knight Commander of Most Honourable Order of the Bath Companion of the Most Honourable Order of the Bath, 1864; Order of Saint John, Knight of Grace; Crimea Medal with Alma, Balaklava, Sebastopol clasps Indian Mutiny Medal; New Zealand War Medal; Ashantee Medal with Coomassie clasp Legion of Honour (5th Class) Turkish Crimea Medal, Sardinian issue

Surgeon-General Sir William Alexander Mackinnon KCB (27 June 1830 – 28 October 1897) was Director-General of the British Army Medical Service (1889–1896).

Mackinnon was born in Strath, Isle of Skye, Scotland. He studied medicine at the University of Glasgow and University of Edinburgh, graduating from Edinburgh in 1851 and receiving an FRCS qualification in 1873. In 1853, he enlisted to the 42nd Regiment of Foot as assistant-surgeon and took part in the Crimean War in Alma, Balaklava and Sevastopol, as well as in the New Zealand Wars (1863–66). Afterwards he served as assistant professor of surgery at Netly (1866–73); Senior Medical Officer of Sir Garnet Wolseley's Ashanti Force (1873–74); Principal Medical Officer at Aldershot, Colchester, Hong Kong, and at Malta (1874–82); Head of the medical Branch of the Director-General's Office in London (1882–87); and Principal Medical Officer at Gibraltar (1887–89).

After being knighted in the 1891 Birthday Honours, Mackinnon served as an Honorary Surgeon to the Queen (QHS). He received an honorary LLD from the University of Glasgow in 1891 and donated £2000 to the university for scholarships. Mackinnon retired on 7 May 1896 and died next year in London.
