= Ngolo =

Ngolo, N'Golo, or NGolo may refer to:

== Geography ==
- N'Goloblasso, town in Ivory Coast
- N'Golobougou, commune in Mali
- N'Golodiana, commune in Mali
- N'golofesso, village in Burkina Faso
- N'Golonianasso, commune in Mali
- Ngolo River, river in Gabon

== People ==
- Gilbert Evenom Ngolo, Malagasy politician
- Navita Ngolo, Angolan politician
- N'Golo Kanté, French footballer
- Ngolo Diarra, King of the Bambara Empire from 1766 to 1795
- Pierre Ngolo, Congolese politician

== Other ==
- Engolo (also known as N'golo or Ngolo), African martial art
- Ngolo, dialect of the Mbosi language
- Ngolo, variation of the Oroko language
- Ngolokwangga, Aboriginal Australian people
