= Felisberto =

Felisberto is a surname and a given name. Notable people with the name include:

Given name:

- Felisberto Caldeira Brant, Marquis of Barbacena (1772–1842), Brazilian soldier & statesman of Portugal and Brazil
- Felisberto Cardoso, Cape Verdean football coach
- Felisberto de Deus (born 1999), athlete from Timor Leste
- Felisberto Fortes (1927–2013), Portuguese rower
- Felisberto Hernández (1902–1964), Uruguayan writer, composer and pianist
- Regis Felisberto Masarim (born 1973), Brazilian footballer
- Felisberto Verano (born 1905), Filipino politician

Surname:

- Albertina Navemba Ngolo Felisberto, Angolan politician for UNITA, member of the National Assembly of Angola
- João Cândido Felisberto (1880–1969), Brazilian sailor
- Ricardo Jorge Guerreiro Felisberto (born 1983), Portuguese footballer known as Katchana
