= Revolt of the Lash =

1910 naval mutiny in Rio de Janeiro, Brazil

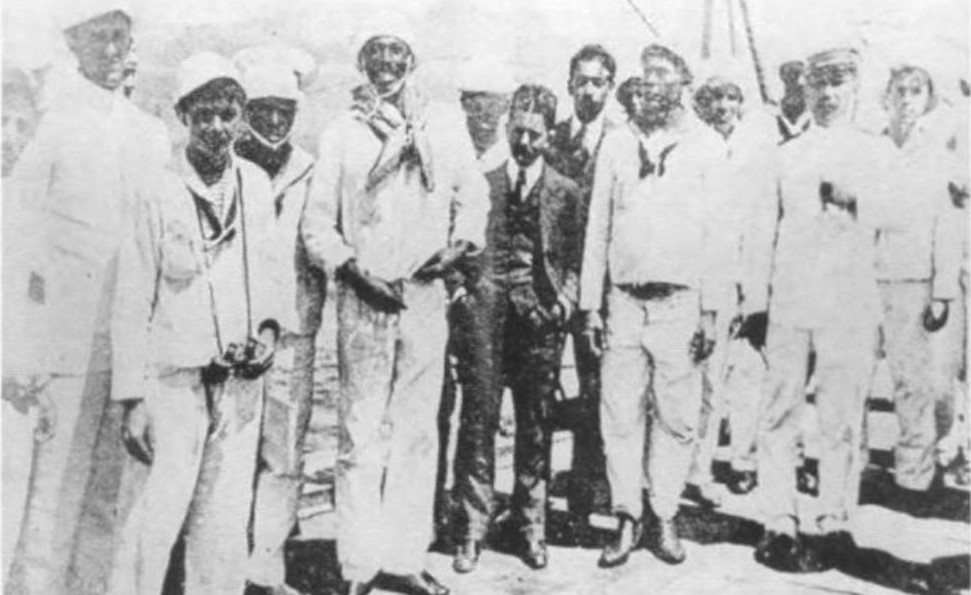
The leader of the Revolt of the Lash, João Cândido (front row, directly to the left of the man in the dark suit), with reporters, police officers and sailors on board Minas Geraes on 26 November 1910.

The Revolt of the Lash (Note: The revolt's English translation has also been rendered as "Chibata Revolt," "Revolt of the Whip," "Revolt against the Lash," and "Sailor's Revolt of 1910.") (Portuguese: Revolta da Chibata) was a naval mutiny in Rio de Janeiro, Brazil, in late November 1910. It was the direct result of the use of whips ("lashes") by white naval officers when punishing Afro-Brazilian and mixed-race enlisted sailors.

At the beginning of the new century rising demand for coffee and rubber enabled Brazilian politicians to attempt to transform their country into an international power. A key part of this would come from modernizing the Brazilian Navy, which had been neglected since the 1889 coup, by purchasing battleships of the dreadnought type, which had been recently introduced. Social conditions in the Brazilian Navy, however, did not keep pace with this new technology. Elite white officers were in charge of mostly black and mixed-race crewmen, many of whom had been forced into the navy on long-term contracts. These officers frequently inflicted corporal punishment on the crewmen for major and minor offenses alike despite the practice's ban in most other countries and in the rest of Brazil.

In response to this violence, sailors launched a carefully planned and executed mutiny in Rio de Janeiro on 22 November 1910. Led by João Cândido, these men managed to take control of both dreadnoughts, one brand-new cruiser, and an older coastal-defense ship, giving them firepower that dwarfed the rest of the navy. To capitalize on the threat these ships posed to the Brazilian capital, the mutineers sent a letter to the government that demanded an end to what they called the "slavery" being practiced by the navy.

While the executive branch of the government plotted to retake or sink the rebelling warships, they were hampered by personnel distrust and equipment problems; historians have since cast doubt on their chances of successfully accomplishing either. At the same time, Congress—led by Senator Rui Barbosa—pursued a route of amnesty, appointing a former navy captain as their liaison to the rebels. This latter route was successful, and a bill granting amnesty to all involved and ending the use of corporal punishment passed the lower house by a veto-proof margin. However, many of the sailors involved were quickly discharged from the navy, and many of the original mutineers were later thrown into jail or sent to rubber collecting regions in the Brazilian Amazon.

== Background ==
In the years preceding the revolt, the Brazilian populace saw frequent changes in the country's political, economic, and social climate. For example, in May 1888, slavery in Brazil was abolished with the enactment into law of the Lei Áurea, a law vehemently opposed by the Brazilian upper class and plantation owners. This discontent among the social elite directly led to a peaceful coup spearheaded by the army and led by Benjamin Constant and Marshal Deodoro da Fonseca. Emperor Pedro II and his family were quickly and quietly sent into exile in Europe; they were replaced with a titular republic with Fonseca as president.

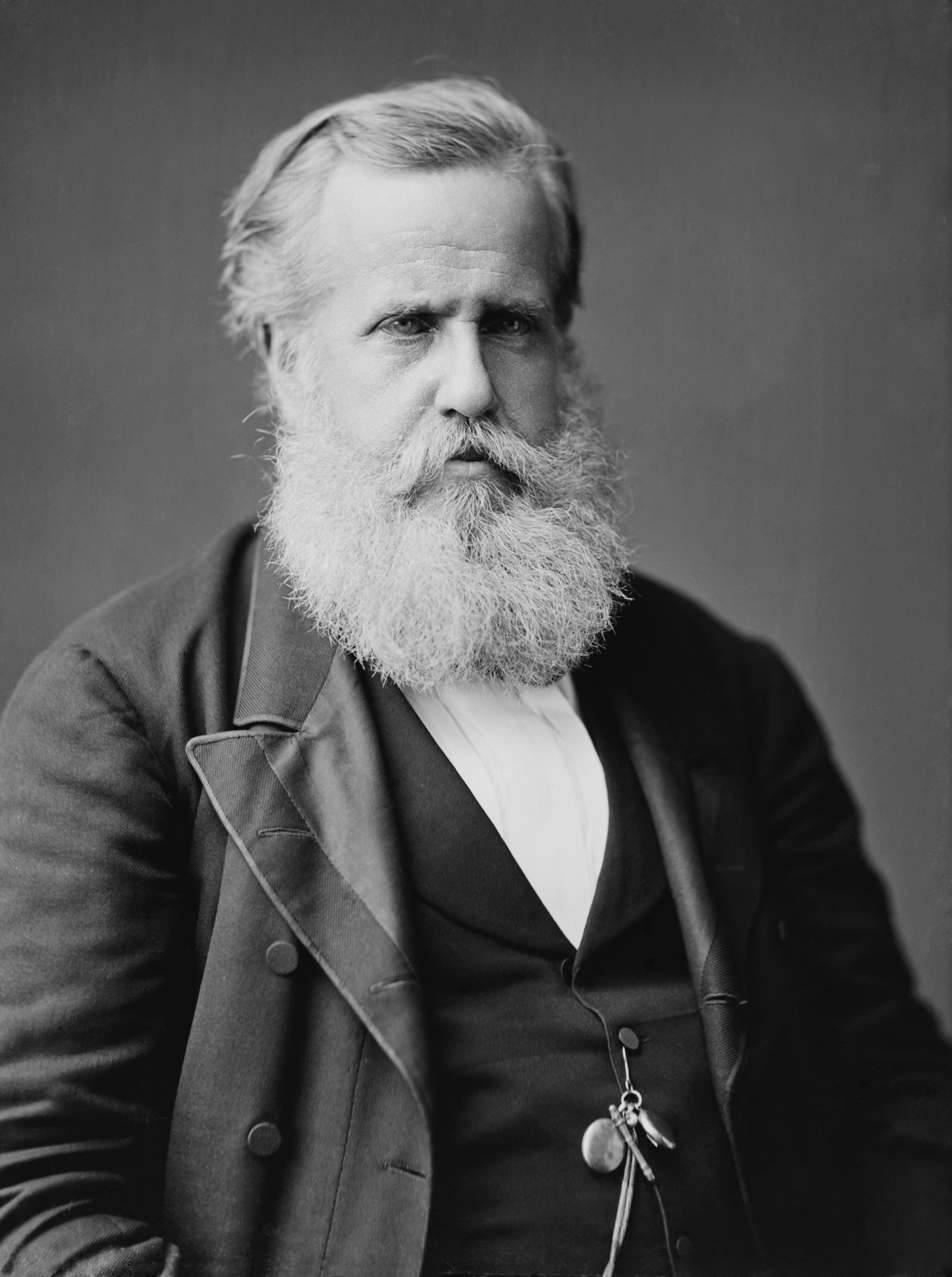
Pedro II, the emperor of Brazil, was deposed in 1889, setting off a decade of unrest in the country

The next decade was marked by several rebellions against the new political order, including naval revolts (1891, 1893–94), the Federalist Rebellion (1893–95), the War of Canudos (1896–97), and the Vaccine Revolt (1904), during which the quality of the Brazilian Navy severely declined relative to its neighbors thanks to an Argentine–Chilean naval arms race. By the turn of the twentieth century, an antiquated Brazilian naval fleet with just forty-five percent of its authorized personnel (in 1896) and only two modern armored warships could be faced by Argentine and Chilean navies filled with ships ordered in the last decade. (Note: In 1893, Rear Admiral Custódio José de Mello, the minister of the navy, revolted against President Floriano Peixoto, bringing nearly all of the Brazilian warships currently in the country with him. Mello's forces took Desterro when the governor surrendered, and began to coordinate with secessionists in the southern province of Rio Grande do Sul, but loyal Brazilian forces overwhelmed them both. Most of the rebel naval forces were sailed to Argentina, where their crews surrendered; the flagship, Aquidabã, held out near Desterro until it was sunk by a torpedo boat.)

However, at the dawn of the new century, rising demand for coffee and rubber gave the Brazilian government an influx of revenue. Contemporary writers estimated that seventy-five to eighty percent of the world's coffee supply was grown in Brazil. Prominent Brazilian politicians, most notably Pinheiro Machado and the Baron of Rio Branco, moved to have the country recognized as an international power, as they believed that the short-term windfall would continue. A strong navy was seen as crucial to this goal. The National Congress of Brazil drew up and passed a large naval acquisition program in late 1904, but it was two years before any ships were ordered. While they first ordered three small battleships, the launch of the revolutionary British HMS Dreadnought—which heralded a new and powerful type of warship—caused the Brazilians to cancel their order in favor of two dreadnoughts. These ships would be named Minas Geraes and São Paulo, and would be accompanied by two smaller cruisers, Bahia and Rio Grande do Sul, and ten destroyers of the Pará class. (Note: A third dreadnought was to follow them, but it was canceled and reordered several times.)

=== Conditions in the navy ===
This technological modernization in the Brazilian Navy was not matched by social change, and tensions between the navy's officer corps versus the regular crewmembers kindled much unrest. A quote from the Baron of Rio Branco, the esteemed politician and professional diplomat, shows one of the sources of tension: "For the recruitment of marines and enlisted men, we bring aboard the dregs of our urban centers, the most worthless lumpen, without preparation of any sort. Ex-slaves and the sons of slaves make up our ships' crews, most of them dark-skinned or dark-skinned mulattos." (Note: 'Dregs' in this context is a translation of the Portuguese fezes, which literally means feces.) Racial differences in the Brazilian Navy would have been immediately apparent to an observer at the time: the officers in charge of the ship were nearly all white, while the crews were heavily black or, to a lesser extent, mixed-race. The visual differences belied deeper distinctions: darker-skinned crewmen, who by the time of the revolt would have been older slaves freed under the Lei Áurea (or sons born free under the 1871 Law of the Free Womb), were almost universally less educated than their white overseers.

The navy, along with other military branches, served as dumping grounds for thousands of young, poverty-stricken, sometimes orphaned black individuals who were stuck in the 'dregs' of Brazil's cities. Many had committed or were suspected of committing crimes—though those not in legal trouble were far from safe, as some recruits were seized off the streets or simply on the losing end of settling a personal score. Such measures served as a "perfect marriage of punishment and reform": people who had or were likely to commit crimes would be removed from society and trained in skills that would benefit the country. These men were commonly sent to the navy, apprenticed around the age of 14, and bound to the navy for fifteen years. João Cândido, a leader in the later Revolt of the Lash, was apprenticed at age 13 and joined the navy at 16. Individuals forced into the navy served for twelve years. Volunteers, who perhaps unsurprisingly made up a very low percentage of recruits, signed on for nine years. (Note: In 1910, the navy reported receiving only 49 volunteers. In the same year, the navy received 924 new sailors from the apprentice schools.)

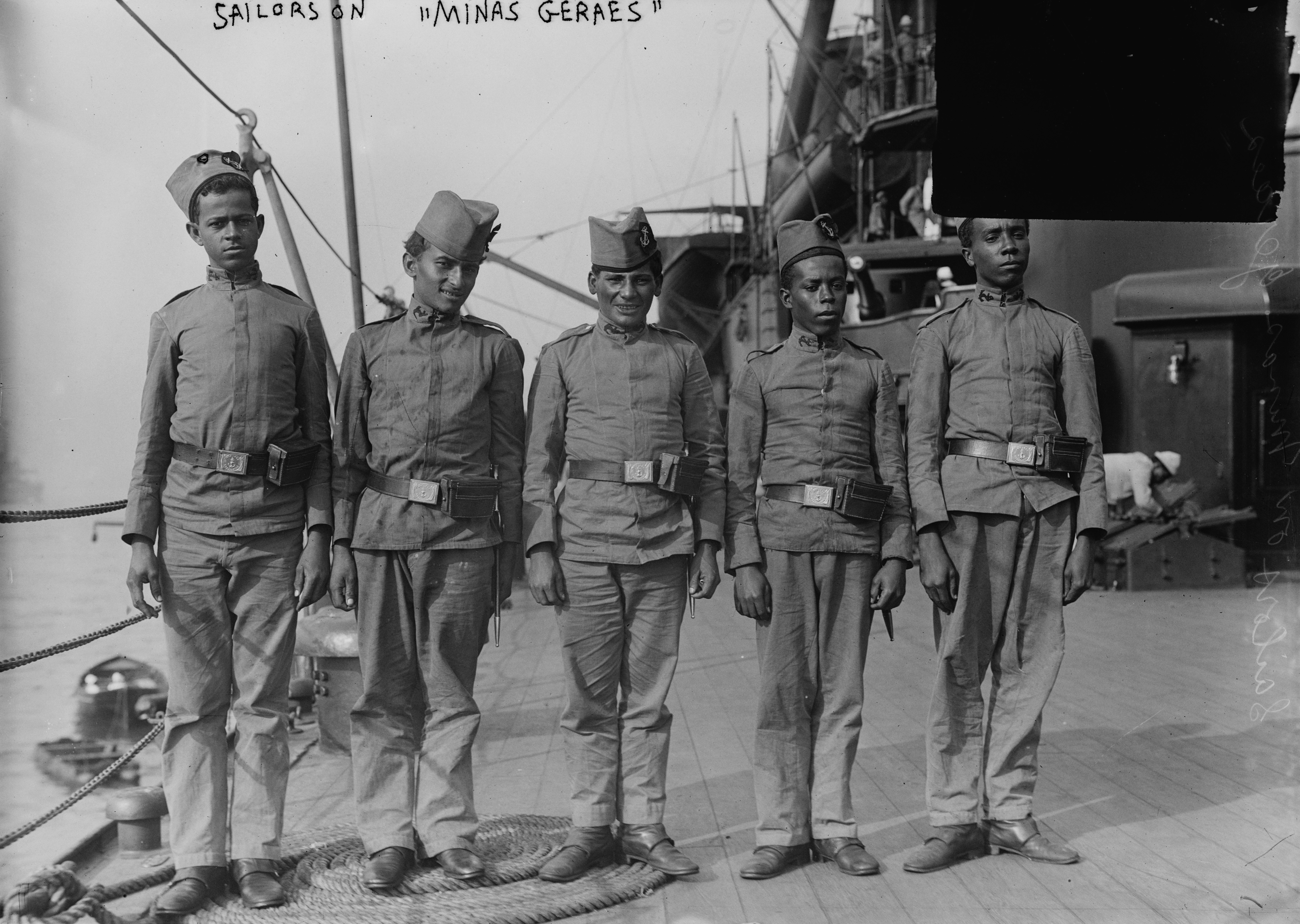
Pardo and preto Brazilian marines pose for a photographer on board Minas Geraes, part of a series of photographs likely taken during the ship's visit to the United States in early 1913

Another point of contention came from the navy's heavy use of corporal punishment for even minor offenses. While such measures had been banned in the general population since the Imperial Constitution of 1824 and in the army since 1874, the navy was only affected in November 1889, when the new republic's legislature forbade such discipline. They rescinded the law less than a year later amid widespread noncompliance. Instead, corporal punishment would only be allowed in a Companhia Correcional (Correctional Company). The legislature envisioned this as a curb on the practice, as only sailors with violent or subversive histories would face the lash. The reality was very different: because the companies existed anywhere on the ships, any sailor could be theoretically transferred to the Companhia Correcional but not have any change in their daily routines.

Most of the Brazilian Navy's officer corps believed that corporal punishment was an essential tool in maintaining discipline on their ships. An anonymous Brazilian admiral, representative of his time, wrote in 1961 that "... our seamen of that time, lacking the moral and intellectual requirements for appreciating the debasing aspects of the punishment [whipping], accepted it naturally, as an opportunity to show their physical and moral superiority. ... All this is ... understandable in the face of the backward mentality and ignorance of the personnel that composed the ship's crews."

== Rebellion ==
=== Preparations and prelude ===
Crewmen aboard Minas Geraes began planning for a revolt years before 1910, according to João Cândido, an experienced sailor who would later become the leader of the Revolt of the Lash. The conspirators were motivated by the treatment of enlisted men in the Brazilian Navy, extending beyond the lash to even their substandard food, which led to not-uncommon outbreaks of beriberi. Some had formed a committee and had been meeting secretly for years in Rio de Janeiro. This semi-formal organization was only expanded when they were sent to Newcastle in the United Kingdom for training—the operation of such large and complex warships required specific skills. When interviewed years after the mutiny, Cândido said that they "maintained the committees in the very hotels where we were residing, awaiting the construction of the ships. Almost two years paid by the Brazilian government, we sent messengers to sound out the situation here [in Brazil]. We did this so that when we arrive, we would be prepared to act"—they were just "waiting for a date and for power," referring to the brand-new warships.

The experience of these crewmen in the United Kingdom was such that historian Zachary Morgan believes that it was a pivotal formative period in shaping the later mutiny. The sailors were paid on time, in cash, and received extra money because they had to buy their own meals; during their time there they faced little if any discrimination; and the Armstrong shipyard workers unionized and even successfully went on strike in the meantime, delaying the completion of the new Brazilian warships. Moreover, they were able to observe their British Royal Navy counterparts—an experience that Morgan says would have been "jarring" because these sailors "were no longer impressed, no longer lashed, [and] were accepted as citizens."

The revolt started shortly after the brutal 250 lashes given to Marcelino Rodrigues Menezes, a regular Afro-Brazilian enlisted sailor, for bringing two bottles of cachaça on board the ship. There is some scholarly disagreement on if this number is correct and exactly when this sentence was carried out, but all agree that it was the immediate catalyst. (Note: Morgan covers the debate over the number in a lengthy footnote. This figure comes from Morel's A Revolta da Chibata, the foundational Portuguese-language study on the Revolt of the Lash, but João Roberto Martins Filho's A Revolta dos Marinheiros, 1910 argues that such a figure would have killed him. Others have suggested that it was a clerical error of one decimal place. In the absence of stronger evidence, Morgan accepts the number. On the exact date of the lashing, Morgan says that it happened on the morning of 16 November, and the mutiny was delayed to avoid unintended political connotations stemming from the presidential inauguration on 15 November—theirs was to be an attack against their treatment by the navy, not on the Brazilian political system as a whole. Historian Joseph Love, however, states that Menezes was whipped on the night of 21 November, with the revolt starting around 10 pm on the 22nd.) A later Brazilian government observer, former navy captain José Carlos de Carvalho, told the president of Brazil that Menezes' back looked like "a mullet sliced open for salting."

=== Mutiny ===
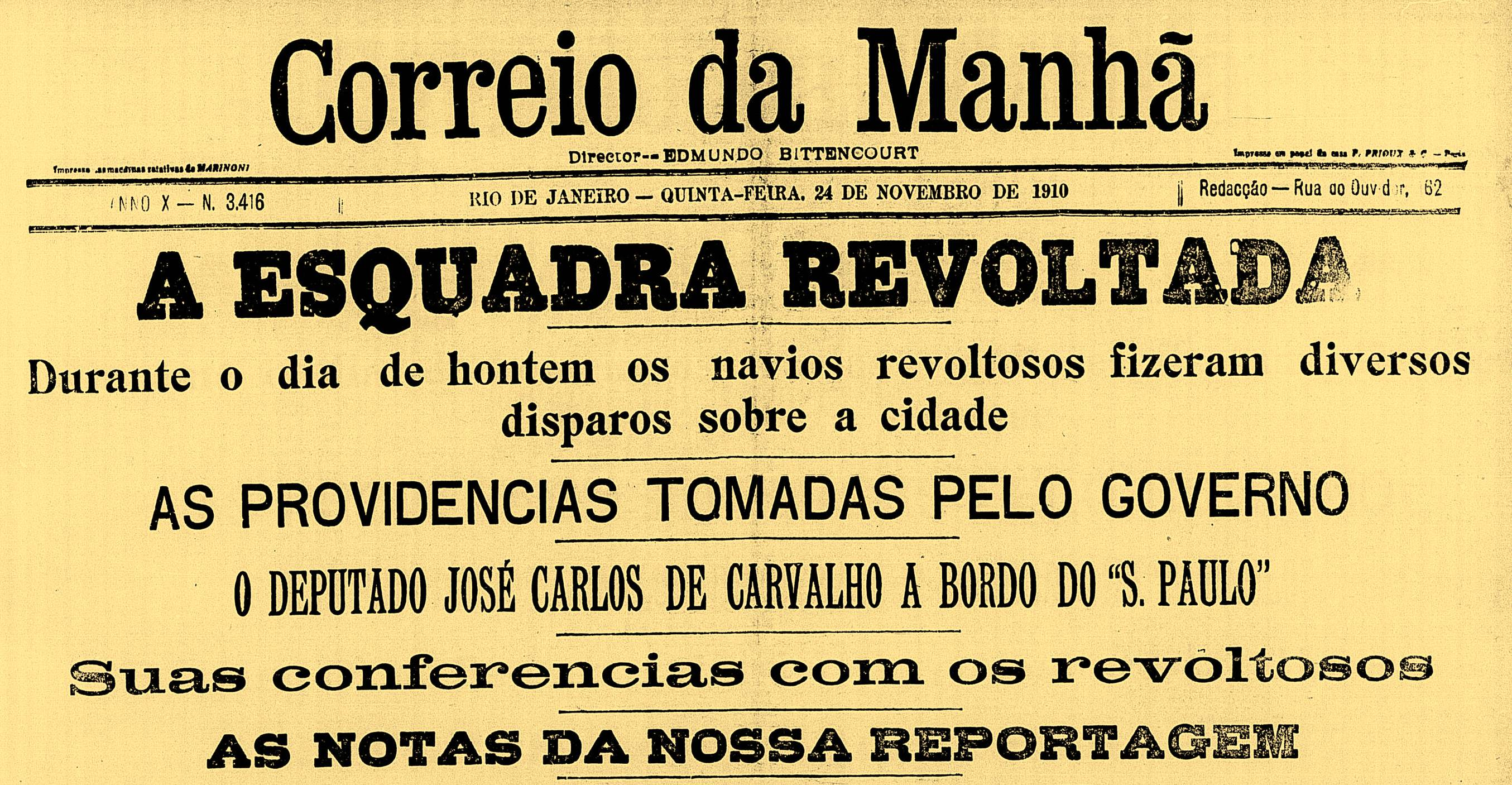
The front page of Rio de Janeiro's Correio da Manhã newspaper on 24 November 1910

About the warships

Minas Geraes, São Paulo, and Bahia represented the newest and largest ships in the Brazilian Navy. All had been completed and commissioned only months before; the first two were dreadnoughts and possibly the most powerful commissioned warships of their type, and Bahia was the fastest scout cruiser in the world. Deodoro was a comparatively older vessel, dating back a bit over a decade, but it was in good condition after a recent refit.

A significant percentage of the naval crewmen stationed in Rio de Janeiro, perhaps 1,500 to 2,000 out of 4,000, revolted at around 10 pm on 22 November. (Note: The most-cited number is 2,379 out of 5,009 total naval crewmen, but Morgan notes that these figures have significant limitations, such as the rates of desertion, the navy-wide manpower shortage, and the men actually involved versus hiding onshore to preserve their lives. He estimates that, in actuality, the number of participating mutineers was between 1,500 and 2,000 and the total number of crewmen present that night was around 4,000.) They began on Minas Geraes, where the ship's commander and several loyal crewmen were killed, and the gunfire on board the dreadnought alerted the other ships in the harbor that the revolt had begun. By midnight, the rebels had São Paulo, the new cruiser Bahia, and the coast-defense ship Deodoro all under control, with the "Admiral" João Cândido in overall command.

The crews of the smaller minelayer República, the training ship Benjamin Constant, and the torpedo boats Tamoio and Tymbira all revolted as well, but they made up only two percent of the overall mutineers. The majority of República's crew left to bolster São Paulo and Deodoro; those aboard the other ships either joined with the rebels or fled ashore.

While most officers were allowed to peacefully leave their ships after the uprisings began, there were notable exceptions: on Minas Geraes, for instance, officers on board had time to draw their weapons and defend themselves. The ship's captain, João Batista das Neves, was killed in the fighting along with several loyal and rebel crewmen. Other bloodshed was much more limited: on the cruiser Bahia, the only officer present was killed after he shot a rebel crewman, and one lieutenant on São Paulo killed himself. Civilian technicians (some of them British), machinists, and other personnel integral to the warships were kept aboard without violence.

By the end of the evening, key warships that remained in government hands included Bahia's sister Rio Grande do Sul, the aging cruiser Almirante Barroso, and the new destroyers of the Pará class. Their potential power, however, was dwarfed by the dreadnoughts—each of which outgunned the combined firepower of all of the warships that remained—and was severely tempered by personnel issues. First, naval officers were suspicious of even those enlisted men who remained loyal to the government. Officers took over all of the positions that would be involved in direct combat, and the numbers of enlisted men were reduced wherever possible. Further complicating matters were missing weapon components, such as firing caps for the destroyers' torpedoes, without which they could not be fired. When caps were finally located and delivered, they did not fit the newer torpedoes carried by the destroyers. The correct caps were only fitted two days after the revolt began.

Before midnight on 22 November, the rebels sent a telegraph to the president, reading "We do not want the return of the chibata [lash]. This we ask the President of the republic and the Minister of the Navy. We want an immediate response. If we do not receive such a response, we will destroy the city and the ships that are not revolting." Fonseca, however, refused to allow any direct contact between himself and the mutineers. Instead, the rebel force moved to Ilha do Viana at 1 am on 23 November to coal and take on supplies to guard against the possibility of an extended siege. After the sun rose, the bodies of the dead sailors from Minas Geraes were sent on a launch to Ilha das Cobras, along with a letter from João Cândido—who was in command of the rebel armada—and his fellow sailors to the Brazilian president Hermes da Fonseca, the nephew of the first president who had been in office for only one week. It included a demand for the end of the 'slavery' being practiced by the navy—most notably the continued use of the lash despite its ban in every other Western nation:

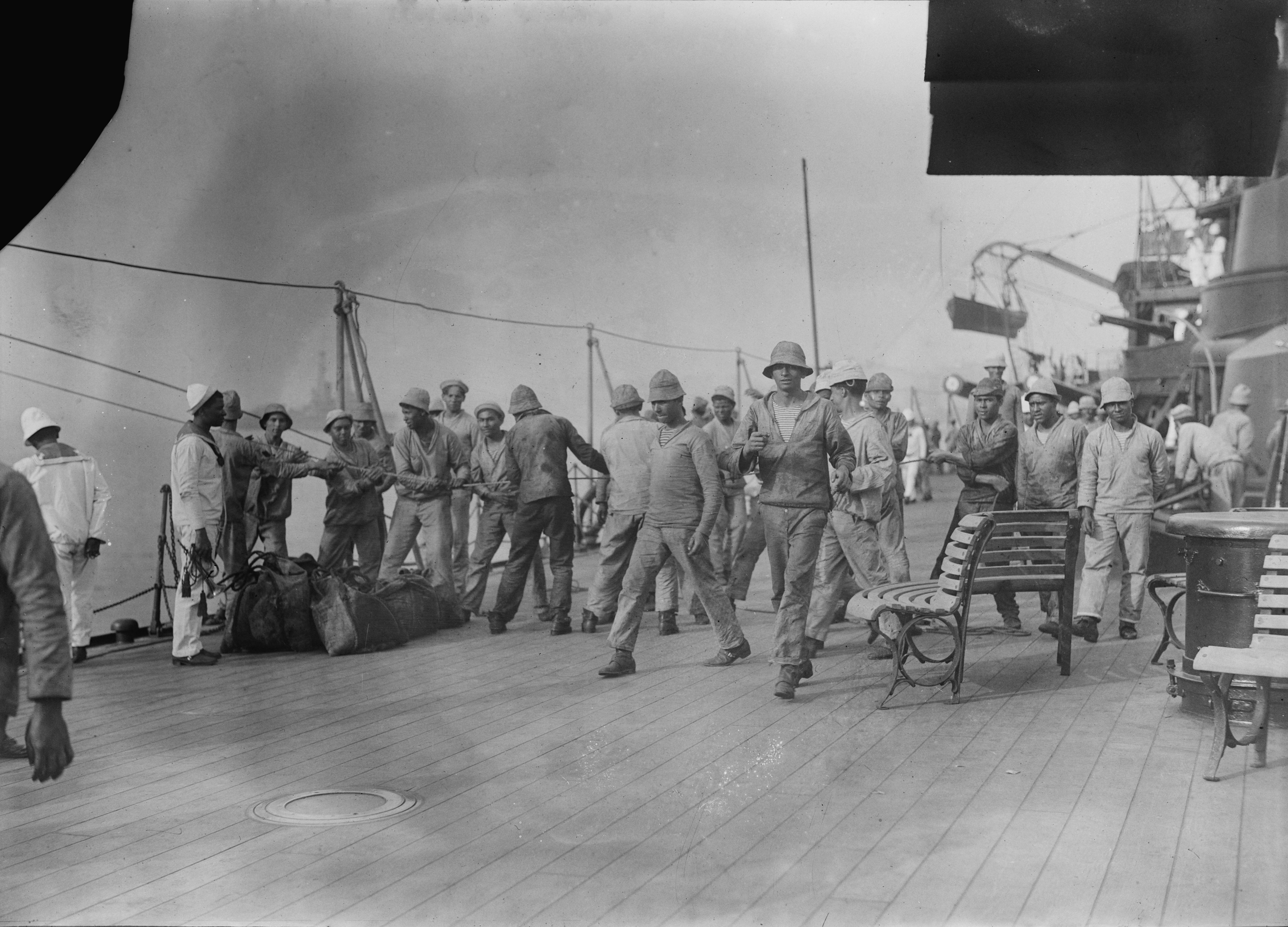
Sailors help refill Minas Geraes' coal bunkers

We, as sailors, Brazilian citizens, and supporters of the republic, can no longer accept the slavery as practiced in the Brazilian Navy, we do not receive—and have never received—the protection guaranteed us by this Nation, we are tearing away the black veil which covers the eyes of this patriotic but misled population. With all the ships under our control, with the officers prisoners, those same officers who made the Brazilian Navy weak by continuing, twenty years after the founding of the Republic, to withhold the treatment we have earned, that of citizens working in defense of our country. We are sending this message in order that his honor the president can grant Brazilian sailors the sacred rights guaranteed us by the laws of the Republic, end the disorder, and grant us some favors to better our Brazilian Navy: such as, to remove incompetent and indignant officers from serving the Brazilian nation. Reform the immoral and shameful code under which we serve, end the use of the whip, the bôlo [the beating of the hand with a ferule] and other similar punishments, raise our pay according to the plan of Dep. José Carlos de Carvalho, educate those seamen who lack the competence to wear our proud uniform, and put a limit on our daily service and see that it is respected. Your Excellency has the pleasure of 12 hours in order to send us a satisfactory response, or else you will see the nation annihilated.

Sent from the Battleship São Paulo on November 22, 1910

Note: The comings and goings of the messengers shall not be interrupted.

Marinheiros

During the same morning, the rebel ships fired on several army forts located around Guanabara Bay, along with the naval arsenal and bases on Ilha das Cobras and Villegagnon Island, Niterói, and the presidential palace. One shell hit a home on Castello Hill, killing two children; while there may have been other casualties, the deaths of these children clearly weighed on the rebels' consciences. Cândido still remembered them decades later, where in an interview he stated that he and his crewmen collected money from their "miserable pay" to pay to bury the children.

Broadly speaking, however, it appears that the ships were well-handled and commanded. Contemporary observers were surprised to note that the crewmen, despite lacking white officers, had complete control of their warships and were able to stay in good formation as they circled around the bay. The rebels favored firing over the city or around government-controlled military targets rather than outright destruction, something that Zachary Morgan believes was motivated by either humanitarian concerns or (at the very least) pragmatism—by limiting the actual damage, they could gain support among legislators, the press, and general population. This has, however, caused a historiographical argument among scholars that persists to this day.

Onshore, civilians woke on the morning of 23 November to find that the most powerful ships in their navy, crewed by the lowest of the underclass, were firing on the city. Thousands quickly fled, although nearly all were unable to. The press initially stoked these peoples' fears, although they later flipped to lionizing the rebels, portraying them as heroes.

Fonseca and the navy's high command were faced with two extremely unpalatable choices. They could use the government-controlled ships to attack and possibly destroy the rebel ships, but doing so would mean destroying three incredibly expensive ships that had received significant global attention and were—in their eyes—a crucial part of refashioning Brazil as a serious international power. Worse, there was a significant chance that the remaining Brazilian ships, all of which were smaller and much older than the ships controlled by the mutineers, would lose if it came to open combat. But by folding and giving into the rebel's list of demands—that is, demands from the underclass and broadly black naval crews—the elites would suffer an incredible embarrassment.

Fonseca chose both. First, the Brazilian Congress began negotiating with the mutineers, although this was not Fonseca's preferred solution—he and the Minister of the Navy Marques Leão began plotting a military solution. At the behest of Congress, José Carlos de Carvalho was appointed as a liaison to the rebels. Carvalho, a federal deputy and former naval captain, talked with the crew on all four ships and reported to Congress that the rebels were well led and organized—and their main armament was fully functional. His report showed that the sailor's complaints, especially about the lash, were well justified and that a military option would be unlikely to succeed. By the afternoon on 23 November, the Brazilian Congress had begun work on a bill that would grant amnesty to all involved and end the use of corporal punishment in the navy.

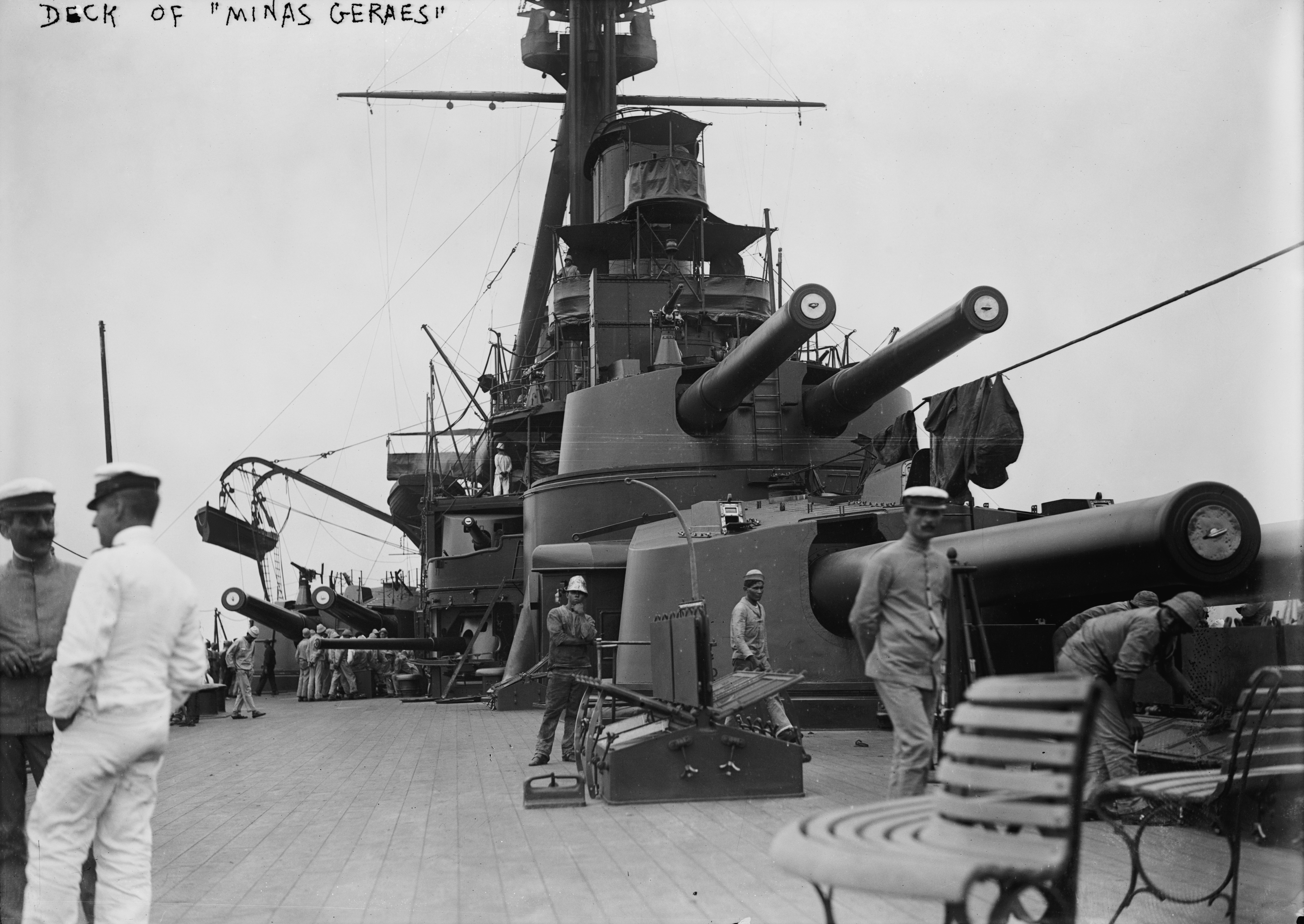
The main deck onboard Minas Geraes

Pressed by his navy minister, Forseca did not yet give up on the military option. On the same afternoon, the rebels received an illicit telegram warning from the government-held destroyer Paraíba that they were planning to attack. In response, the rebels moved outside of the bay for the evening in an attempt to make any torpedo-led assault more difficult. They returned on 24 November at 10 am, a day where Correio da Manhã was the first press source to refer to Cândido as the "admiral" of the rebel fleet. They later noted:

[It had] become evident that, in express opposition to the determination of Brazil's highest law, the general use and abuse of corporeal punishment continues aboard our ships. That, as in the time of the slave quarters and the plantation overseer, the chibata cuts the skin of our sailors, consonant with the whims of more or less vitriolic officers. It is also verified, by the laments of the revolting men, that the meals offered in the sailors mess halls are pernicious, prepared with adulterated and rotten produce, not suitable for dogs. These facts constitute abundant motivation for the government to energetically and firmly proceed in establishing a respect for the equity and justice that is now demanded.

In Congress, the influential senator and losing presidential candidate Rui Barbosa championed the rebels' cause. Barbosa used the navy officials' rhetoric against them in arguing for a diplomatic solution, noting that if the new dreadnoughts were as unsinkable as they claimed, the remaining warships in government hands would certainly not be able to force a military victory. Furthermore, he argued, if such an attack had the support of Congress and failed, any resulting destruction of Rio de Janeiro would be considered their fault. These arguments won Barbosa much support in the Senate, so much that the body began working on an amnesty that would absolve the mutineers of all criminal charges once the ships were turned back over to the government. After hours of debate, the bill was passed unanimously that day and sent to the lower Chamber of Deputies on 25 November.

Naval leaders disagreed and continued planning for a military confrontation. Zachary Morgan writes that "naval leaders believed that only a military confrontation with the rebels would restore their lost honor," and that any such action would have to take place before an amnesty was approved. That left very little time. The aforementioned armament and personnel problems handicapped the government ships; an attempt to procure the necessary torpedoes was foiled by Deodoro's guns. When night fell on 23 November, radio messages about available torpedoes to the government destroyers, huddled for protection, did not reach the ships. They were only able to obtain these weapons on 24 November, and during that night, Fonseca ordered them to attack the rebel ships. However, they were not given the chance to attack, as the rebel armada did not return to Guanabara Bay until the amnesty was passed by Congress. It is not known if the rebels were warned or were simply taking defensive precautions.

The amnesty was passed by the Chamber of Deputies by a vote of 125–23. Under the threat of having a veto overridden, Fonseca signed the amnesty. The rebels returned on 26 November after a short period of consternation—additional demands, such as an increase in salary, had yet to be proposed in Congress, much less passed—with their ships in formation, Minas Geraes leading São Paulo, with Bahia and Deodoro to each side. By 7 pm, the mutineers officially accepted the amnesty provisions.

== Aftermath ==
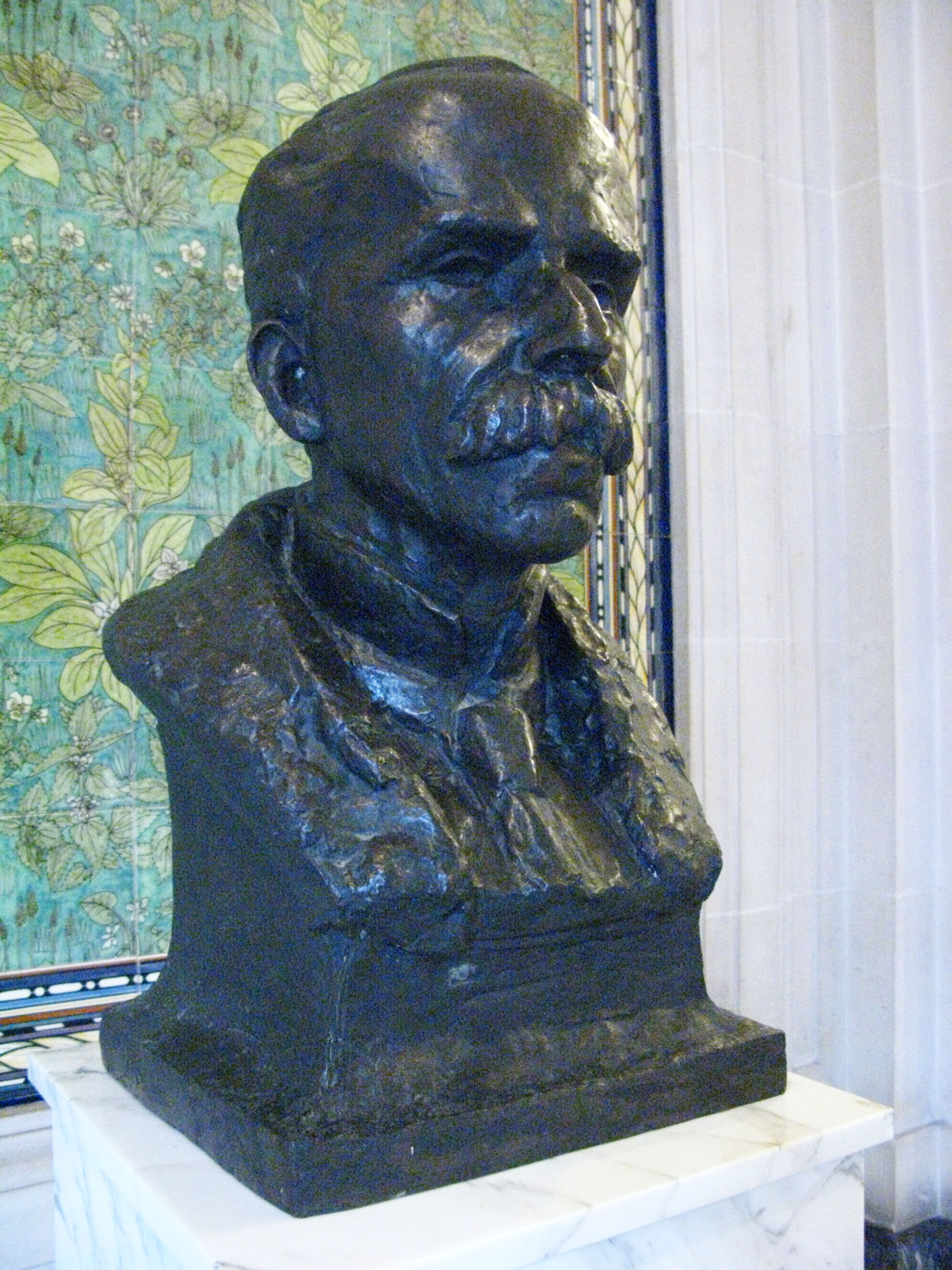
Bust of Rui Barbosa in the Hague

In the aftermath of the revolt, the two Brazilian dreadnoughts were disarmed by the removal of their guns' breechblocks. The revolt and consequent state of the navy, which was essentially unable to operate for fear of another rebellion, caused many leading Brazilians, including the president, prominent politicians like Barbosa and the Baron of Rio Branco, and the editor of the most respected newspaper in Brazil, Jornal do Commercio, to question the use of the new ships and support their sale to a foreign country. (Note: On the status of Jornal do Commercio within Brazil, see Love, Revolt, 3.) The British ambassador to Brazil, W.H.D. Haggard, was ecstatic at Rio Branco's about-face, saying "This is indeed a wonderful surrender on the part of the man who was answerable for the purchase and who looked upon them as the most cherished offspring of his policy." Rui Barbosa was emphatic in his opposition to the ships in a speech given shortly before the vote on the amnesty bill:

Let me, in conclusion, point out two profound lessons of the bitter situation in which we find ourselves. The first is that a military government is not one whit more able to save the country from the vicissitudes of war nor any braver or resourceful in meeting them than a civil government. The second is that the policy of great armaments has no place on the American continent. At least on our part and the part of the nations which surround us, the policy which we ought to follow with joy and hope is that of drawing closer international ties through the development of commercial relations, the peace and friendship of all the peoples who inhabit the countries of America. The experience of Brazil in this respect is decisive. All of the forces employed for twenty years in the perfecting of the means of our national defense have served, after all, to turn upon our own breasts these successive attempts at revolt. International war has not yet come to the doors of our republic. Civil war has come many times, armed by these very weapons which we have so vainly prepared for our defense against a foreign enemy. Let us do away with these ridiculous and perilous great armaments, securing international peace by means rather of just and equitable relations with our neighbors. On the American continent, at least, it is not necessary to maintain a 'peace armada'; that hideous cancer which is devouring continuously the vitals of the nations of Europe.

In the end, the president and cabinet decided against selling the ships because of a fear of a consequent negative effect in domestic politics—even though they agreed that the ships should be disposed of, possibly to fund smaller warships capable of traversing Brazil's many rivers. The executive's apprehension was heightened by Barbosa's speech given before the revolt's end, as he also used the occasion to attack the government—what he called the "brutal militaristic regime." Still, the Brazilians ordered Armstrong to cease working towards laying down a third Minas Geraes-class dreadnought, which induced the Argentine government to not pick up their contractual option for a third dreadnought. The United States' ambassador to Brazil cabled home to state that the Brazilian desire for naval preeminence in Latin America was quelled, although this proved to be short-lived.

=== Imprisonment ===
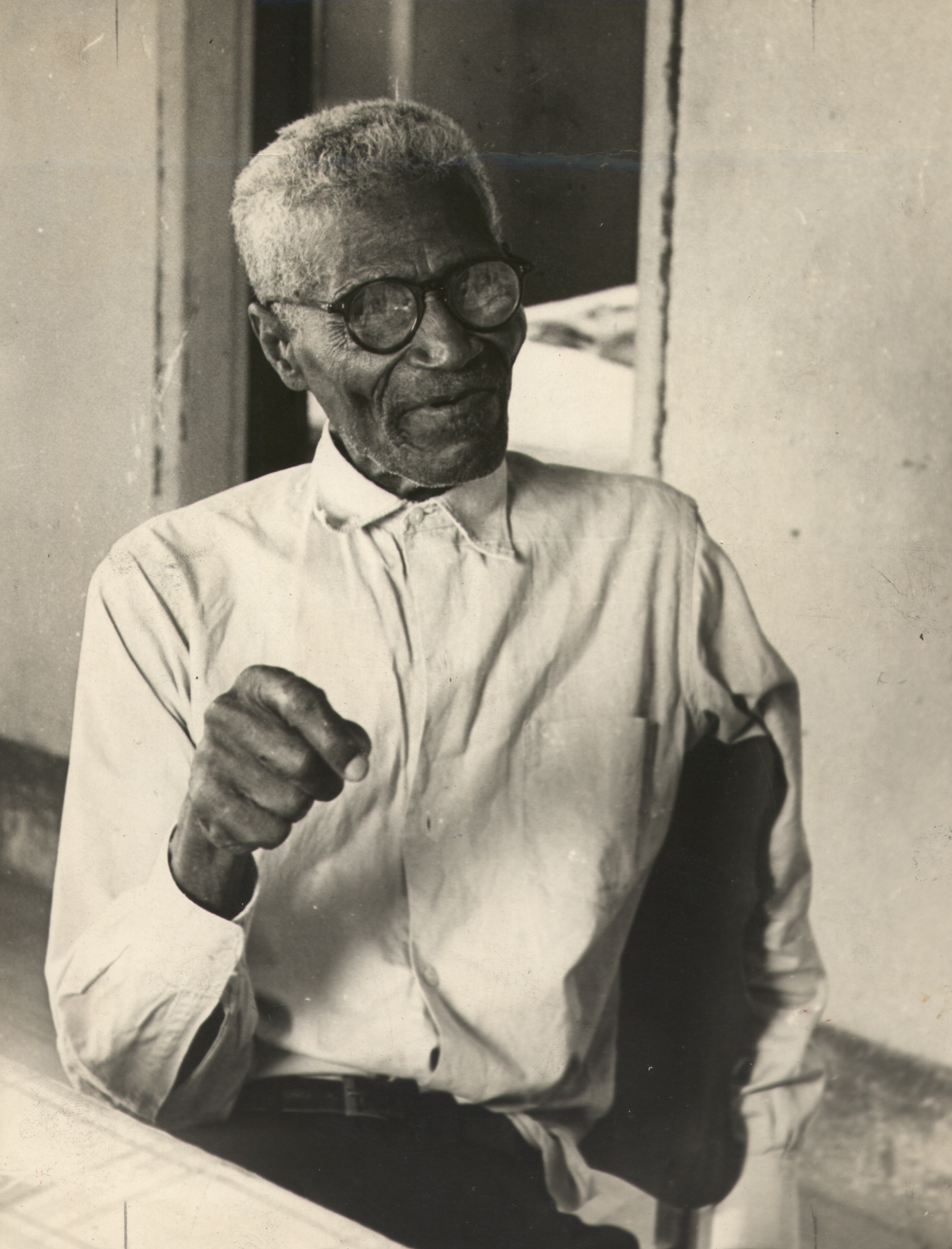
João Cândido in 1963

Meanwhile, the decision to extend an amnesty to the mutineer sailors engendered much criticism from Brazil's upper classes. As historian Zachary Morgan put it, "for the elite, the intention of the naval renovation itself was to fix their institution, propelling Brazil to the front of a South American arms race, and to make their navy competitive with that of any Western nation. Instead, enlisted men had used those very ships to humiliate the naval elite. The ships were saved, but at what cost?" These sailors were given shore leave on the day the revolt ended (26 November). In the next days, the ships were disarmed to prevent a recurrence of events, and many of those seen as rebels were discharged from the navy as threats to the service's discipline. The resulting unplanned loss of nearly 1,300 sailors forced the Brazilian Navy to hire Portuguese merchant crewmen to fill the gaps. The government later claimed that over 1,000 of the dismissed sailors were given tickets to their home states to get them out of the capital.

These rapid changes raised tensions between officers and their charges, and over thirty sailors were arrested in early December and accused of planning a new rebellion—which led to that feared second rebellion. On 9 December, crewmen onboard Rio Grande do Sul, the only one of Brazil's major new warships to not take part in the Revolt of the Lash, mutinied but did not gain enough traction to take the ship. Shortly after, the marine infantry battalion at the naval facilities on Ilha das Cobras revolted. (Note: Morgan notes that while planned independently, the Ilha das Cobras garrison had gotten word of the revolt on Rio Grande do Sul before starting their own.) The government acted quickly and put down both rebellions, but they caused the Brazilian Congress to declare that Rio de Janeiro was in a state of siege, thereby giving President Fonseca a suite of tools to combat the unrest. The vote was nearly unanimous; the only vote against came from Rui Barbosa.

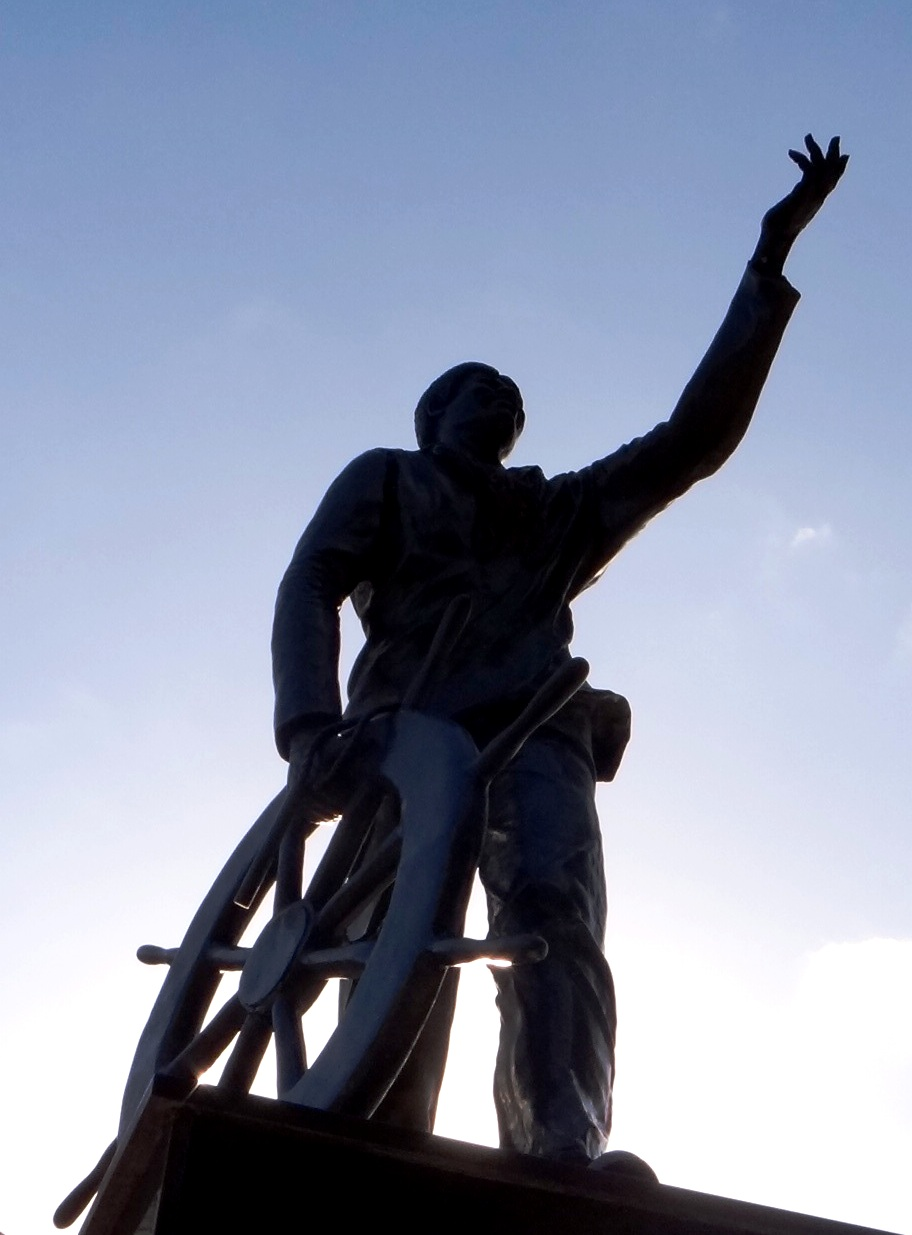
Monument to Cândido in Brazil, overlooking Ilha das Cobras

Historians now hold that there was likely no cross-pollination between the Revolt of the Lash and these subsequent revolts. The formerly mutinous Minas Geraes, under the command of João Cândido after the officers abandoned the ship, used a hidden-away gun (as the ship had otherwise been disarmed after the Revolt of the Lash) to fire on the marine infantry and demonstrate their loyalty. Even so, the government and navy, fueled by anger over their lost honor, used this opportunity to round up the remaining amnestied sailors and put them in prison.

Sailors that did not escape, over 600 of them, were imprisoned on Ilha das Cobras. There, João Cândido and seventeen others were transferred to an isolation cell; by the next morning, only two were left alive. The rest were victims of a heat-producing chemical reaction between quicklime, used to disinfect the cell, and carbon dioxide. Meanwhile, a steamship named Satelite left Rio de Janeiro for the rubber collecting regions in the Amazon with over a hundred former sailors and nearly three hundred so-called "vagabonds" on board. Nine were executed by the crew along the way, and many of the rest died shortly after while working on the collecting regions in the hot tropical climate, conditions described by Rui Barbosa as "a place where one only dies." Meanwhile, João Cândido—stricken by hallucinations from his traumatic night—was sentenced to a mental hospital. It took eighteen months before he and nine other sailors faced trial for their supposed anti-government actions taken during the December 9–10 revolts. The judges found them not guilty, and all were discharged from the navy.

For the sailors that remained in or were joining the navy, conditions did not immediately change. Sailors, including in the maligned naval apprenticeship schools, did begin graduating with basic literacy—a significant improvement on previous practices. However, these did not include the sailors already in the navy, and a program to change that was shelved when a new administration was put into place in 1912. The navy was instead left to fall into disrepair for a time, not unlike what had happened in 1893. "Rather than starting over by raising the level of sailors and officers to that of their technically advanced warships," Morgan writes, "the ships that offered the promise of modernity to the Brazilian nation were allowed to deteriorate—as did the navy alongside them."

== See also ==
- Russian battleship Potemkin, site of a major rebellion by enlisted sailors against their officers in 1905 and one of the first steps towards the Russian Revolutions of 1917
