= Brazilian battleship Minas Geraes =

20th-century dreadnought

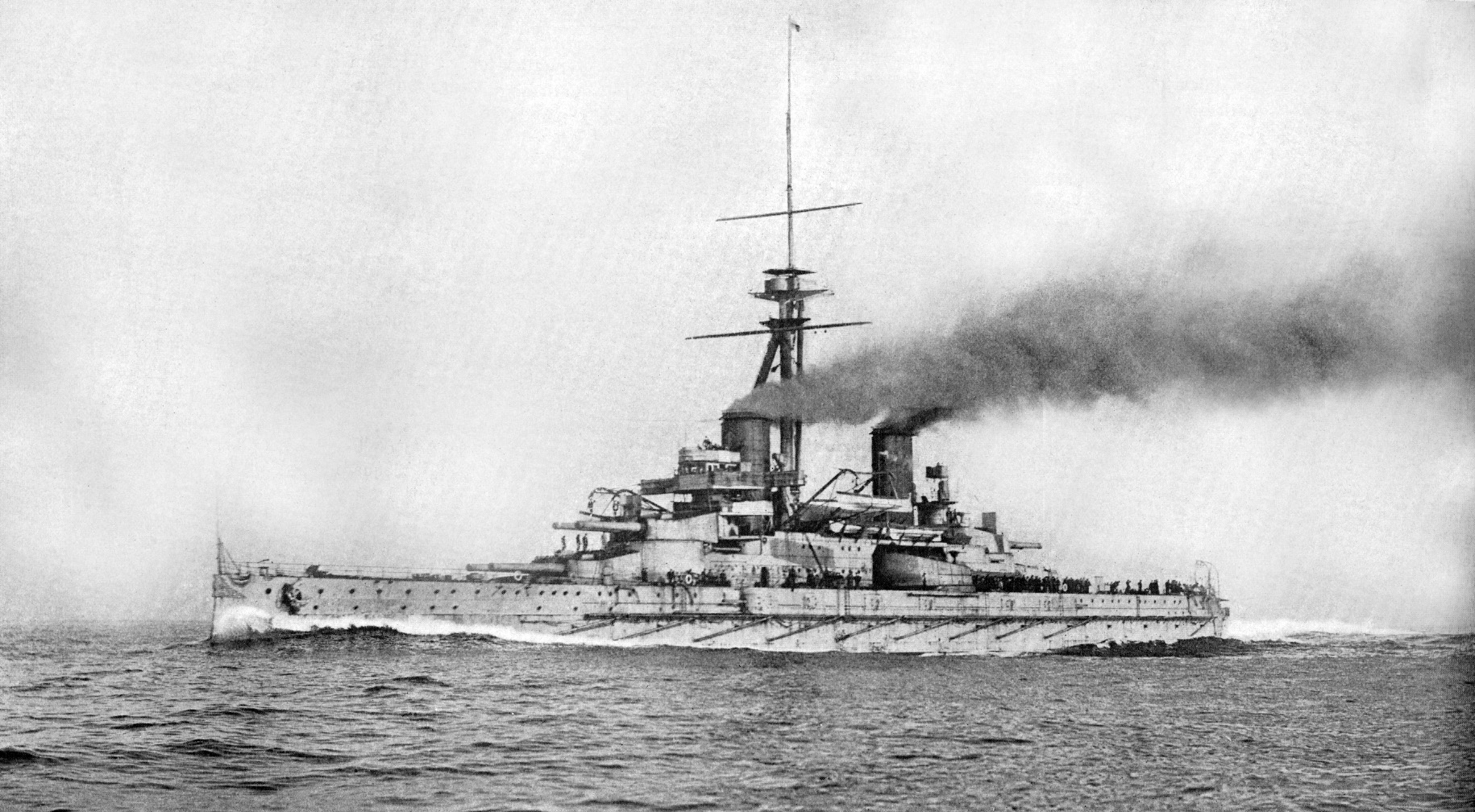
- Minas Geraes at sea in 1909–1910

History

Brazil
- Name: Minas Geraes
- Namesake: Minas Gerais
- Ordered: 1906
- Builder: Armstrong Whitworth
- Cost: $8,863,842
- Yard number: 791
- Laid down: 17 April 1907
- Launched: 10 September 1908
- Completed: 5 January 1910
- Commissioned: 18 April 1910
- Decommissioned: 16 May 1952
- Stricken: 31 December 1952
- Fate: Scrapped 1954

General characteristics
- Class & type: Minas Geraes-class battleship
- Displacement: 19,281 tonnes (18,976 long tons; 21,254 short tons) normal; 21,200 t (20,900 long tons; 23,400 short tons) full load
- Length: 543 ft (166 m) overall; 530 ft (160 m) at waterline
- Beam: 83 ft (25 m)
- Draft: 25 ft (7.6 m)
- Propulsion: 2-shaft Vickers VTE; 18 Babcock & Wilcox boilers; 23,500 shp
- Speed: 21 knots (24 mph; 39 km/h)
- Range: 10,000 nmi (12,000 mi; 19,000 km) at 10 knots (12 mph; 19 km/h)
- Complement: 900 (Note: This is the number of crewmen the ship carried early in its career; with subsequent modifications, refits and modernizations, the figure would have varied.)
- Armament: (as built); 12 × 12 in (305 mm)/45 cal guns (6 × 2); 22 × 4.7 (120 mm)/50 cal guns; 8 × 3-pounder (47 mm) guns
- Armor: Belt: 9 inches (230 mm); Belt extremities: 6–4 in (150–100 mm); Casemate: 9 inches (230 mm); Turrets: 12–9 in (300–230 mm); Conning tower: 12 inches (300 mm)

Minas Geraes, spelled Minas Gerais in some sources, (Note: Geraes was the spelling when the ship was commissioned, but later changes to Portuguese orthography deprecated it in favor of Gerais.) was a dreadnought battleship of the Brazilian Navy. Named in honor of the state of Minas Gerais, the ship was laid down in April 1907 as the lead ship of its class, making the country the third to have a dreadnought under construction and igniting a naval arms race between Brazil, Argentina, and Chile.

Two months after its completion in January 1910, Minas Geraes was featured in Scientific American, which described it as "the last word in heavy battleship design and the ... most powerfully armed warship afloat". In November 1910, Minas Geraes was the focal point of the Revolt of the Lash. The mutiny, triggered by racism and physical abuse, spread from Minas Geraes to other ships in the Navy, including its sister São Paulo, the elderly coastal defense ship Deodoro, and the recently commissioned cruiser Bahia. Led by João Cândido, the mutineers threatened to bombard the Brazilian capital of Rio de Janeiro if their demands were not met. As it was not possible to end the situation militarily—the only loyal troops nearby being small torpedo boats and army troops confined to land—the National Congress of Brazil conceded to the rebels' demands, including a grant of amnesty, peacefully ending the mutiny.

When Brazil entered the First World War in 1917, Britain's Royal Navy declined Brazil's offer of Minas Geraes for duty with the Grand Fleet because the ship was outdated; it had not been refitted since entering service, so range-finders and a fire-control system had not been added. São Paulo underwent modernization in the United States in 1920; in 1921, Minas Geraes received the same treatment. A year later, Minas Geraes sailed to counter the first of the Tenente revolts. São Paulo shelled the rebels' fort, and they surrendered shortly thereafter; Minas Geraes did not fire its guns. In 1924, mutineers seized São Paulo and attempted to persuade the crews of Minas Geraes and several other ships to join them, but were unsuccessful.

Minas Geraes was modernized at the Rio de Janeiro Naval Yard in the 1930s, and underwent further refitting from 1939 to 1943. During the Second World War, the ship was anchored in Salvador as the main defense of the port, as it was too old to play an active part in the war. For the last nine years of its service life, Minas Geraes remained largely inactive, and was towed to Italy for scrapping in March 1954.

== Background ==
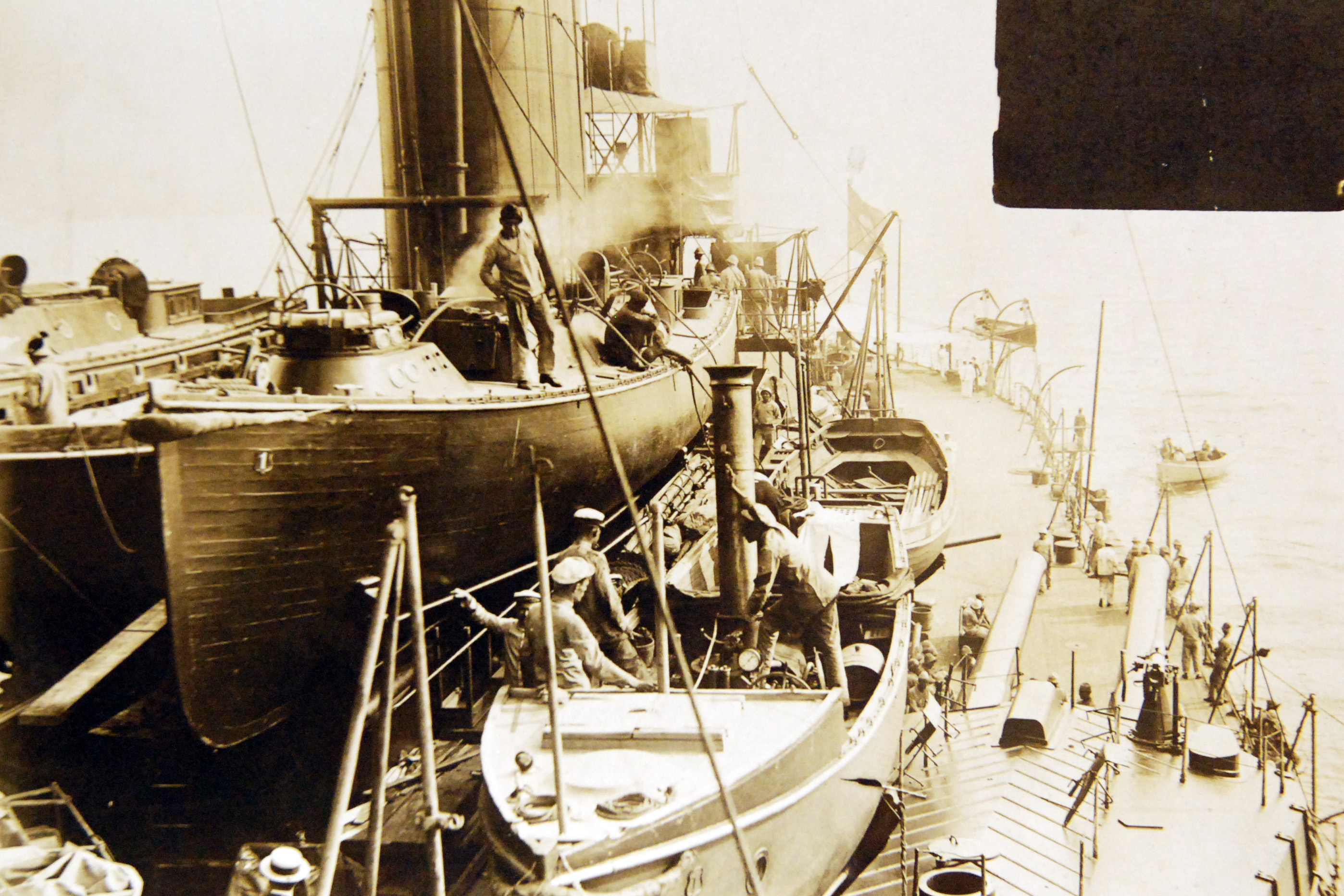
View of the Minas Geraes from above one of the gun turrets

Beginning in the late 1880s, Brazil's navy fell into obsolescence, helped along by an 1889 revolution, which deposed Emperor Dom Pedro II, and naval revolts in 1891 and 1893–94. By the turn of the 20th century, it was lagging behind the Chilean and Argentine navies in quality and total tonnage, (Note: Chile's naval tonnage was 36,896 long tons (37,488 t), Argentina's 34,425 long tons (34,977 t), and Brazil's 27,661 long tons (28,105 t). For an account of the Argentinian–Chilean naval arms races, see Scheina, Naval History, 45–52.) despite Brazil having nearly three times the population of Argentina and almost five times the population of Chile.

At the turn of the twentieth century, soaring demand for coffee and rubber brought prosperity to the Brazilian economy. The government of Brazil used some of the extra money from this economic growth to finance a large naval building program in 1904, which authorized the construction of a large number of warships, including three battleships. The Minister of the Navy, Admiral Júlio César de Noronha, signed a contract with Armstrong Whitworth for three battleships on 23 July 1906. While the first designs for these ships were derived from the Norwegian coastal defense ship Norge and the British (originally Chilean) Swiftsure class, (Note: Incidentally, the Swiftsure class, named Constitución and Libertad before being bought by the British, were the two Chilean warships sold as part of the 1902 Argentinian–Chilean pacts that ended their naval arms race.) the contracted ships were to follow Armstrong Whitworth's Design 439 (Design 188 in Vickers' files). They would displace 11,800 long tons (12,000 tonnes), have a speed of 19 knots (22 mph; 35 km/h), and be protected by belt armor of 9 inches (23 cm) and deck armor of 1.5 in (3.8 cm). Each ship would be armed with twelve 10-inch (25 cm) guns mounted in six twin turrets. These turrets would be mounted in a hexagonal configuration, similar to the later German Nassau-class battleships.

Two of these ships were laid down by Armstrong in Elswick (Minas Geraes and Rio de Janeiro), while the other was subcontracted out to Vickers in Barrow (São Paulo). The new dreadnought concept, which premiered in December 1906 upon the completion of the namesake ship in December 1906, rendered the Brazilian ships obsolete. The money authorized for naval expansion was redirected by new Minister of the Navy, Rear Admiral Alexandrino Faria de Alencar, to building two dreadnoughts, with plans for a third dreadnought after the first was completed, two scout cruisers (which became the Bahia class), ten destroyers (the Pará class), and three submarines (the Foca class). The three battleships on which construction had just begun were demolished beginning on 7 January 1907, and the design of the new dreadnoughts was approved by the Brazilians on 20 February 1907.

Even though the greater cost of these ships meant that only two ships could begin immediately, plans went ahead. Minas Geraes, the lead ship, was laid down by Armstrong on 17 April 1907, while São Paulo followed thirteen days later at Vickers. The news shocked Brazil's neighbors, especially Argentina, whose Minister of Foreign Affairs remarked that either Minas Geraes or São Paulo could destroy the entire Argentine and Chilean fleets. In addition, Brazil's order meant that they had laid down a dreadnought before many of the other major maritime powers, such as Germany, France or Russia, (Note: Although Germany laid down Nassau two months after Minas Geraes, Nassau was commissioned first.) and the two ships made Brazil just the third country to have dreadnoughts under construction, behind the United Kingdom and the United States. In particular, the United States now actively attempted to court Brazil as an ally; caught up in the spirit, U.S. naval journals began using terms like "Pan Americanism" and "Hemispheric Cooperation". Newspapers and journals around the world, particularly in Britain and Germany, speculated that Brazil was acting as a proxy for a naval power which would take possession of the two dreadnoughts soon after completion, as they did not believe that a previously insignificant geopolitical power would contract for such powerful armament.

== Early career ==
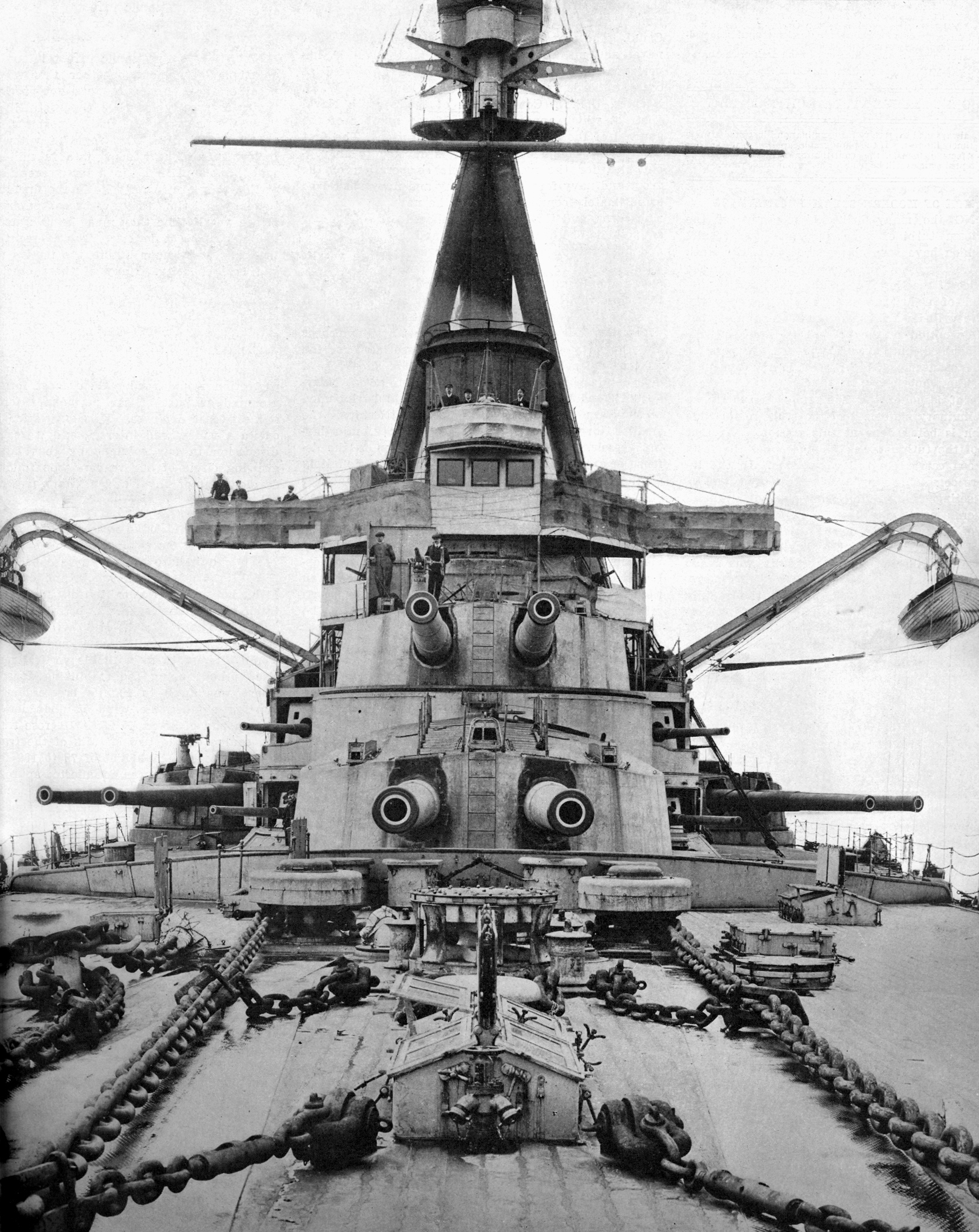
Minas Geraes' superstructure and fore main guns in 1910; note the presence of wing turrets on either side of the superstructure

Minas Geraes was christened by Senhora Regis de Oliveira, the wife of the Brazilian minister to Great Britain, and launched at Newcastle-on-Tyne on 10 September 1908. During fitting-out, it was moved to Vickers' Walker Yard, and thousands turned out to see the incomplete ship squeeze barely underneath and through overhead and swing bridges. After completion, Minas Geraes was handed over by Armstrong on 5 January to the Brazilian Commission on behalf of the Brazilian government, while the ship's company was mustered on deck. The British Royal Navy carried out its gunnery trials at Armstrong's request, and with the agreement of the Brazilian government. Although the idea of having superfiring turrets was not new—the American South Carolina-class battleships were also designed and built in this fashion around the same time—the trials attracted interest from a few nations, who sent representatives to observe. They wanted to resolve two major questions: the effect that firing the upper superfiring turrets would have on the crewmen in the lower guns, and whether smoke from the discharge of the lower guns would hinder the targeting capabilities of the upper turret. The tests resolved both questions satisfactorily.

Minas Geraes left the Tyne on 5 February 1910 and traveled to Plymouth before beginning a voyage to the United States on 8 February. When the ship reached Norfolk, Virginia, it escorted the American armored cruiser North Carolina, which was carrying the body of the former Brazilian ambassador to the United States Joaquim Nabuco (who had died in Washington, D.C., on 17 January) to Rio de Janeiro. The two ships set sail on 17 March 1910 and reached Rio de Janeiro one month later, where Minas Geraes was commissioned into the Brazilian Navy on 18 April.

Soon after Minas Geraes' arrival in Brazil, the country's prosperity began to wane, and a severe depression hit the Brazilian economy. The economic hardship, the racism prevalent in all branches of the Brazilian armed forces, and the severe discipline enforced on all navy ships spawned a mutiny known as the Revolt of the Lash, or Revolta da Chibata, among sailors on the most powerful ships.

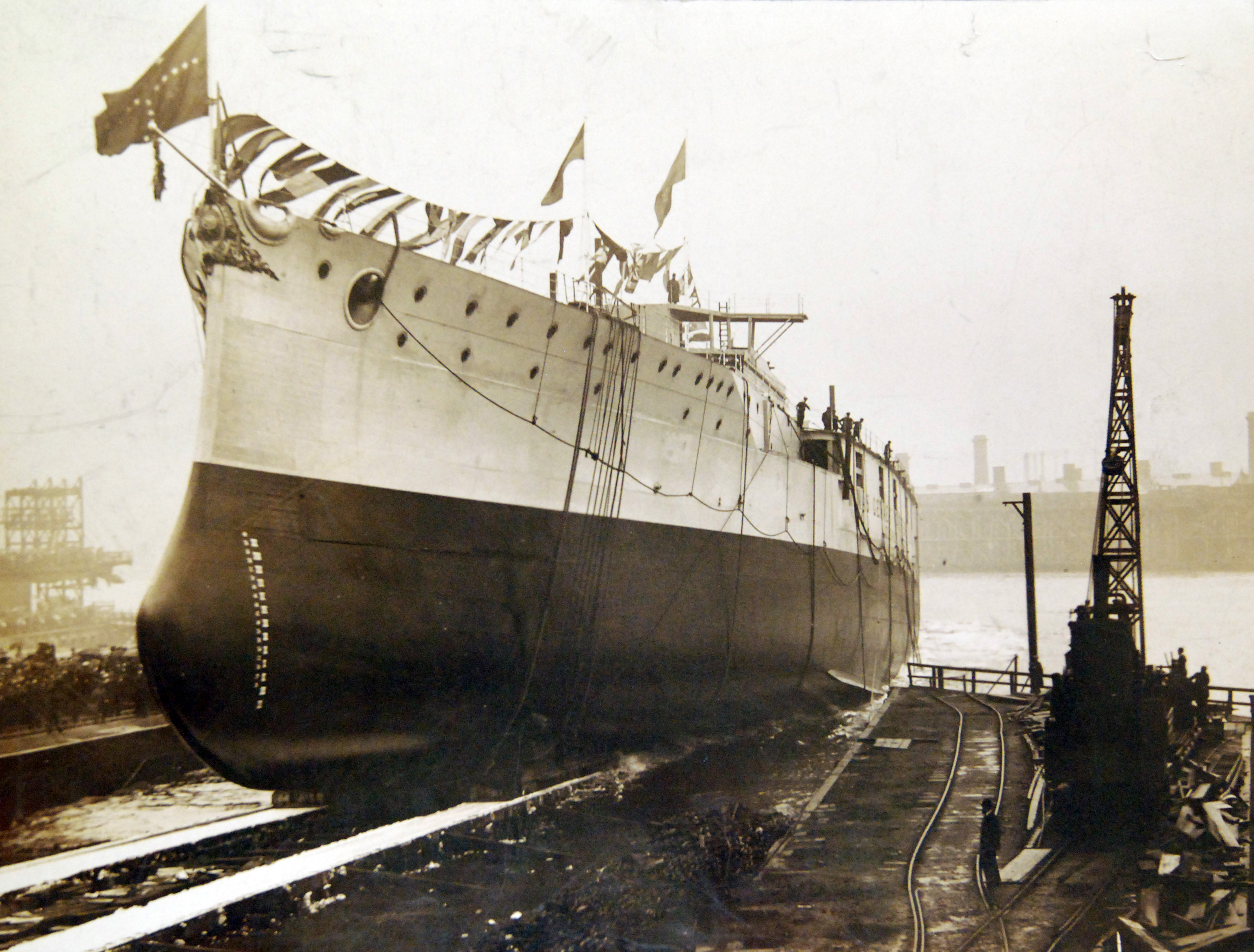
Launch of the Minas Geraes

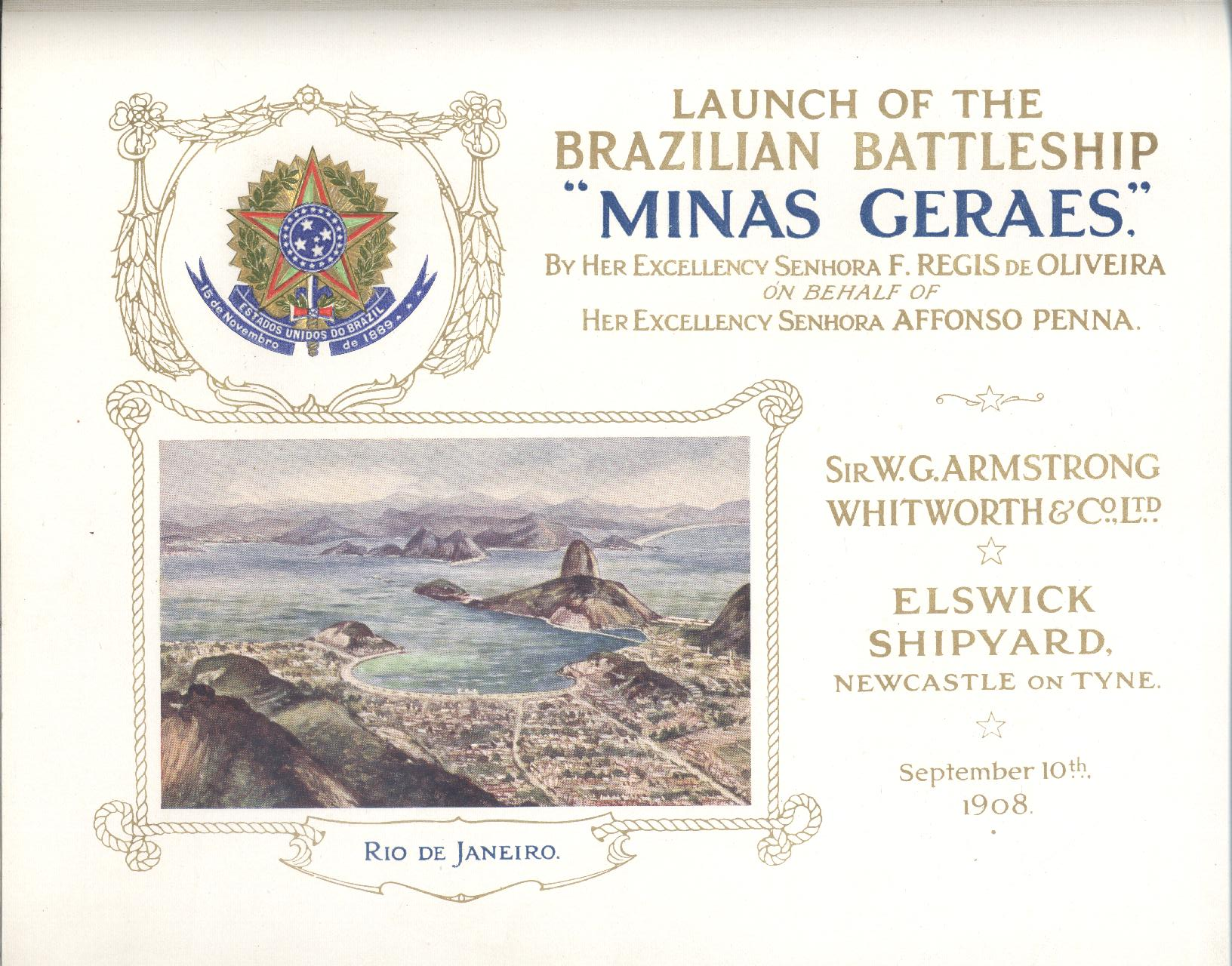
Invitation to the launch of Minas Geraes on 10 September 1908

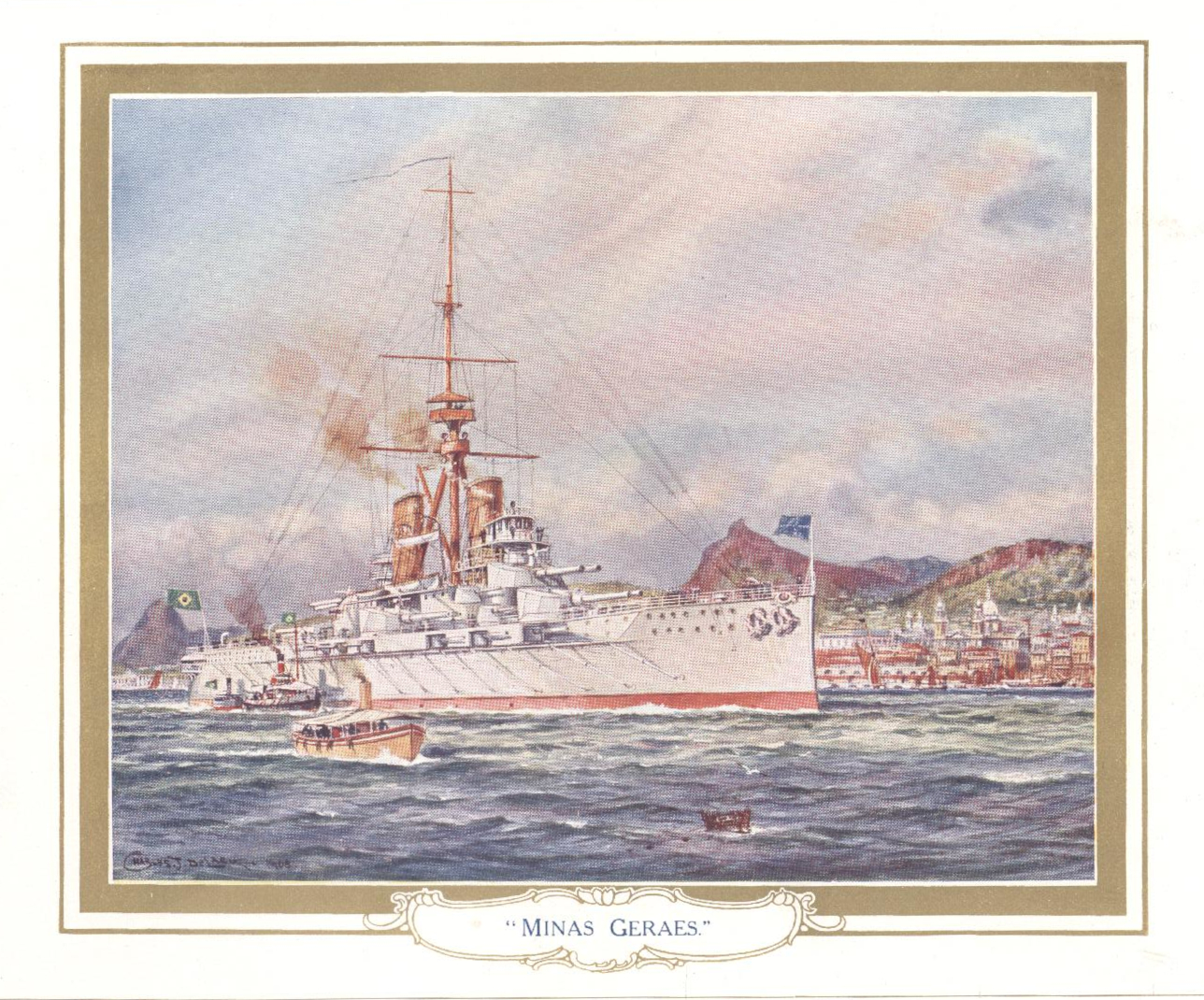
Minas Geraes painted in 1908 by Charles de Lacy for Armstrong Whitworth, from printed booklet available at launch

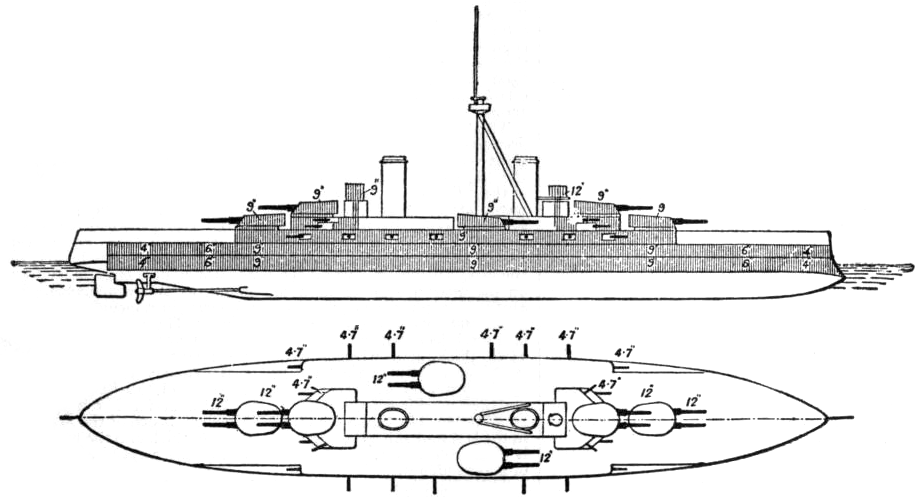
Arrangements of Guns and Armour of Minas Geraes c. 1910

=== Revolt of the Lash ===
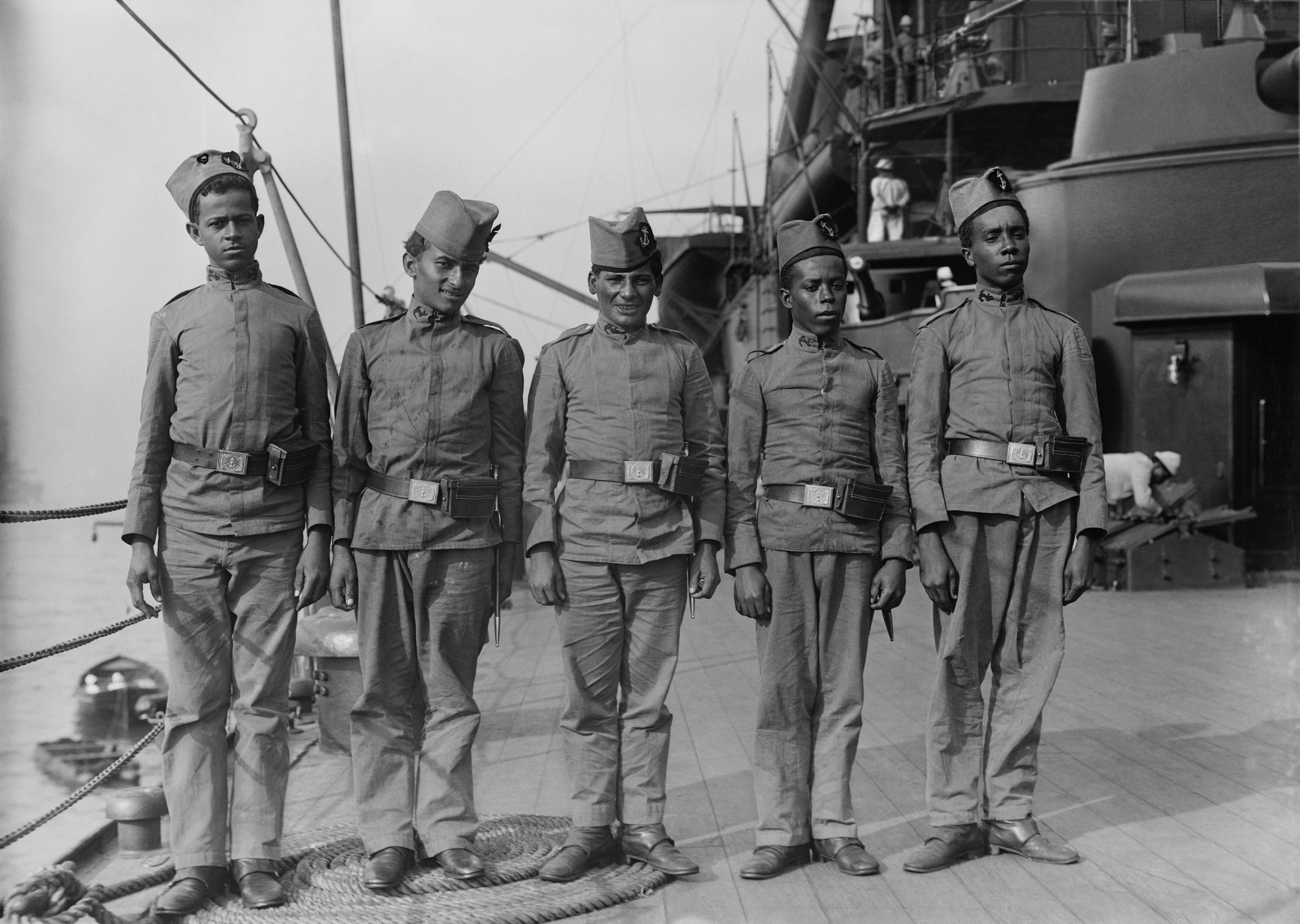
Afro-Brazilian and pardo sailors pose for a photographer on board Minas Geraes, probably during the ship's visit to the United States in early 1913.

The initial spark was provided on 16 November 1910 when Afro-Brazilian sailor Marcelino Rodrigues Menezes was brutally flogged 250 times for insubordination. The sailor's back was later described by José Carlos de Carvalho, a retired navy captain assigned to be the Brazilian government's representative to the mutineers, as "a mullet sliced open for salting." Many Afro-Brazilian sailors were sons of former slaves, or were former slaves freed under the Lei Áurea (abolition) but forced to enter the navy. They had been planning a revolt for some time, and Menezes became the catalyst. The revolt began aboard Minas Geraes at around 10 pm on 22 November; the ship's commander and several loyal crewmen were murdered in the process. Soon after, São Paulo, the new cruiser Bahia, the coast-defense ship Deodoro, the minelayer República, the training ship Benjamin Constant, and the torpedo boats Tamoio and Tymbira all revolted with relatively little violence. The first four ships represented the newest and strongest ships in the navy; Minas Geraes, São Paulo, and Bahia had been completed and commissioned only months before. Deodoro was twelve years old and had recently undergone a refit. The crews of the smaller warships made up only two percent of the mutineers, and some moved to the largest ships after the revolt began.

The ships were well-supplied with foodstuffs, ammunition, and coal, and the only demand of mutineers—led by João Cândido—was the abolition of what they called slavery: they objected to low pay, long hours, inadequate training, and punishments including bolo (being struck on the hand with a ferrule) and the use of whips or lashes (chibata), which eventually became a symbol of the revolt. By the 23rd, the National Congress had begun discussing the possibility of a general amnesty for the sailors. Senator Ruy Barbosa, long an opponent of slavery, lent a large amount of support, and the measure unanimously passed the Federal Senate on 24 November. The measure was then sent to the Chamber of Deputies.

Humiliated by the revolt, naval officers and the president of Brazil were staunchly opposed to amnesty, so they quickly began planning to assault the rebel ships. The officers believed such an action was necessary to restore the service's honor. The rebels, believing an attack was imminent, sailed their ships out of Guanabara Bay and spent the night of 23–24 November at sea, only returning during daylight. Late on the 24th, the President ordered the naval officers to attack the mutineers. Officers crewed some smaller warships and the cruiser Rio Grande do Sul, Bahia's sister ship with ten 4.7-inch guns. They planned to attack on the morning of the 25th, when the government expected the mutineers would return to Guanabara Bay. When they did not return and the amnesty measure neared passage in the Chamber of Deputies, the order was rescinded. After the bill passed 125–23 and the president signed it into law, the mutineers stood down on the 26th.

During the revolt, the ships were noted by many observers to be well handled, despite a previous belief that the Brazilian Navy was incapable of effectively operating the ships even before being split by a rebellion. João Cândido ordered all liquor thrown overboard, and discipline on the ships was recognized as exemplary. The 4.7-inch guns were often used for shots over the city, but the 12-inch guns were not, which led to a suspicion among the naval officers that the rebels were incapable of using the weapons. Later research and interviews indicate that Minas Geraes' guns were fully operational, and while São Paulo's could not be turned after salt water contaminated the hydraulic system, British engineers still on board the ship after the voyage from the United Kingdom were working on the problem. Still, historians have never ascertained how well the mutineers could handle the ships.

The crews of the torpedo boats remained loyal to the government, and army troops moved to the presidential palace and the coastline, but neither group could stop the mutineers; a major problem for the authorities was that many of the men who manned Rio de Janeiro's harbor defenses were sympathetic to the mutineers' cause. The additional possibility of the capital being bombarded forced the National Congress of Brazil to give in to the rebels' demands. The demands included the abolition of flogging, improved living conditions, and the granting of amnesty to all mutineers. The government also issued official pardons and a statement of regret. Its submission resulted in the rebellion's end on 26 November, when control of the four ships was handed back to the navy.

In 1913, Minas Geraes took the Brazilian Minister of Foreign Affairs, Lauro Müller, to the United States, reciprocating the visit U.S. Secretary of State Elihu Root had paid to Brazil seven years earlier.

== First World War ==
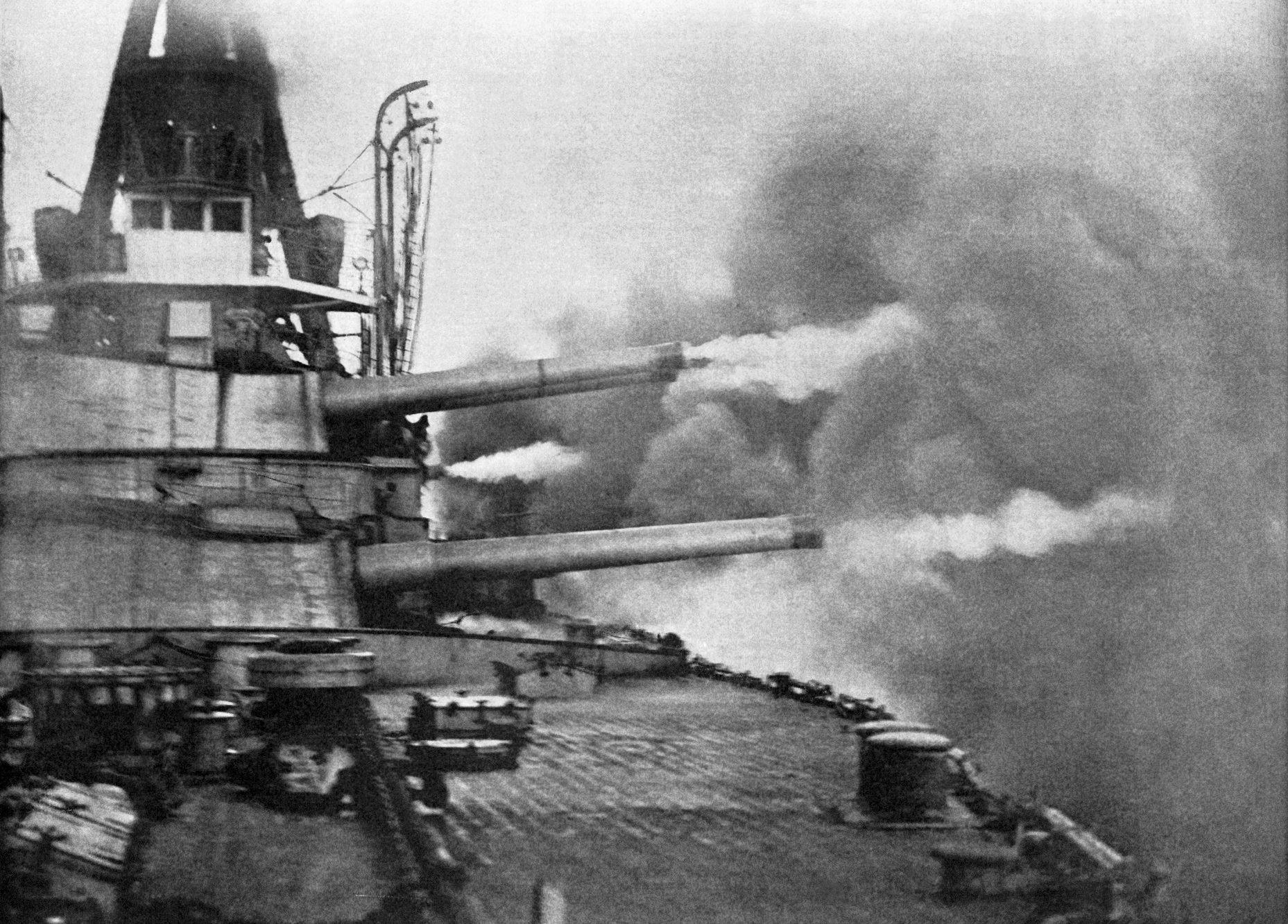
Minas Geraes' gun trials; this picture was taken when ten 12-inch guns were trained to port to fire a full broadside. A Scientific American article of 1910 remarked that this was "the greatest broadside ever fired from a battleship".

Even though the First World War did not touch Brazilian soil, it had crushing effects on Brazil's economy. Prices for rubber and coffee plummeted; the war had only a small need for rubber, and Britain allowed no coffee into Europe as space on merchant ships was reserved for "essential items". In addition, coffee was declared to be contraband, so every Brazilian shipment to the Central Powers was subject to search and seizure; even shipments to some neutral countries were barred to ensure that no coffee would get through. Despite these restrictions, neutral (Note: Brazil officially declared its neutrality on 4 August 1914.) Brazil was pro-Allied for the first three years of the war because of its sizable merchant fleet; as merchantmen from Allied countries were sunk, Brazilian ships were able to take over routes that had been vacated. This policy exposed them to attack by German submarines, and after the German declaration of unrestricted submarine warfare in February 1917, several Brazilian ships were sunk, driving the country closer to declaring war on the Central Powers.

Brazil revoked its neutrality in the war between the United States and Germany on 1 June 1917, but did not declare war. At the same time, all German merchant ships interned in Brazilian harbors, 45 in all, were boarded and seized; most were unusable due to neglect or sabotage. On 28 June, Brazil revoked its neutrality between all of the Allied and Central Powers, allowing Brazilian merchantmen to travel in Allied convoys, but again stopped short of declaring war.

The Brazilian Navy was sent out to patrol the South Atlantic with French, British and American naval units, although none of its ships had anti-submarine capabilities and, not being at war with the Central Powers, its ships were not supposed to engage any threat outside territorial waters. Another Brazilian merchant ship, Macao, was sunk by German submarine U-93 off Spain on 18 October, and eight days later Brazil declared war.

Brazil offered to send Minas Geraes and São Paulo to serve with the British Grand Fleet, but this offer was declined because both ships were in poor condition and lacked modern fire-control systems. Neither of the two dreadnoughts had undergone any form of refitting since their original construction in Britain. Fourteen of São Paulo's eighteen boilers failed when sailing to New York in June 1918 for a modernization.

== Inter-war period ==
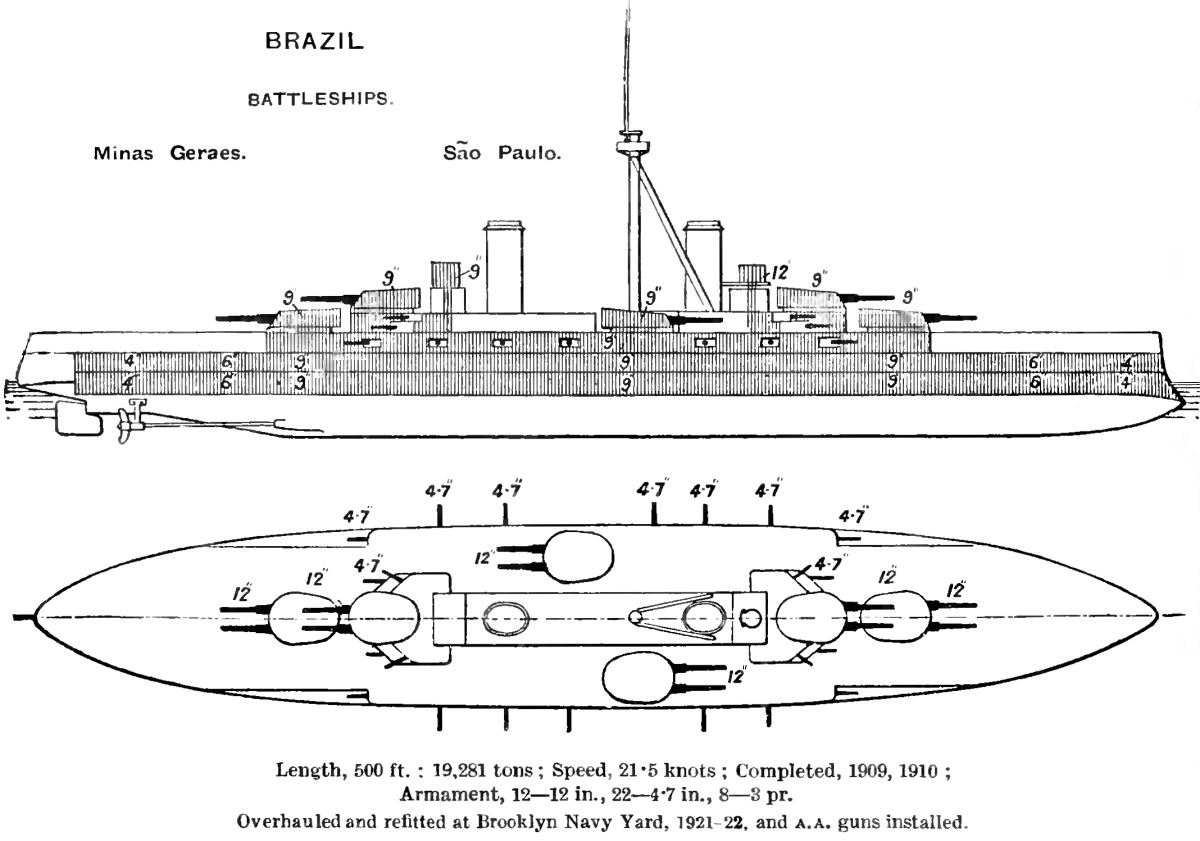
Sketches of a Minas Geraes–class ship from the 1923 Brassey's Naval and Shipping Annual, depicting the ships after their 1920s refits in the United States

São Paulo's refit was finished on 17 January 1920 and it returned to Brazil; on 15 July Minas Geraes departed for New York for its own refit. Beginning on 22 August, the day it arrived, and finishing on 4 October 1921, the battleship was dramatically modernized, with Sperry fire-control equipment and Bausch and Lomb range-finders for the two superfiring turrets fore and aft. A vertical armor bulkhead was fitted inside the main turrets, and the secondary battery of 4.7 in (120 mm) guns was reduced from 22 to 12; five guns in casemates were removed from each side. A few modern AA guns were fitted: two 3"/50 caliber guns from Bethlehem Steel were added on the aft superstructure, 37 mm (1.5 in) guns were added near each turret, and 3-pounder guns were removed from the tops of turrets. While being refitted on 16 September 1921, a squad of Brazilian sailors stood at attention on the rear deck of the ship as the remains of the crew of the ZR-2 dirigible disaster passed by on the British light cruiser HMS Dauntless.

In July 1922, Minas Geraes joined São Paulo in helping to quash the first of the Revolução Tenentista (English: Tenente revolts), in which the garrison of Rio de Janeiro's Fort Copacabana rebelled and began bombarding the city. São Paulo shelled the fort, and the rebels surrendered shortly thereafter; Minas Geraes did not fire its guns.

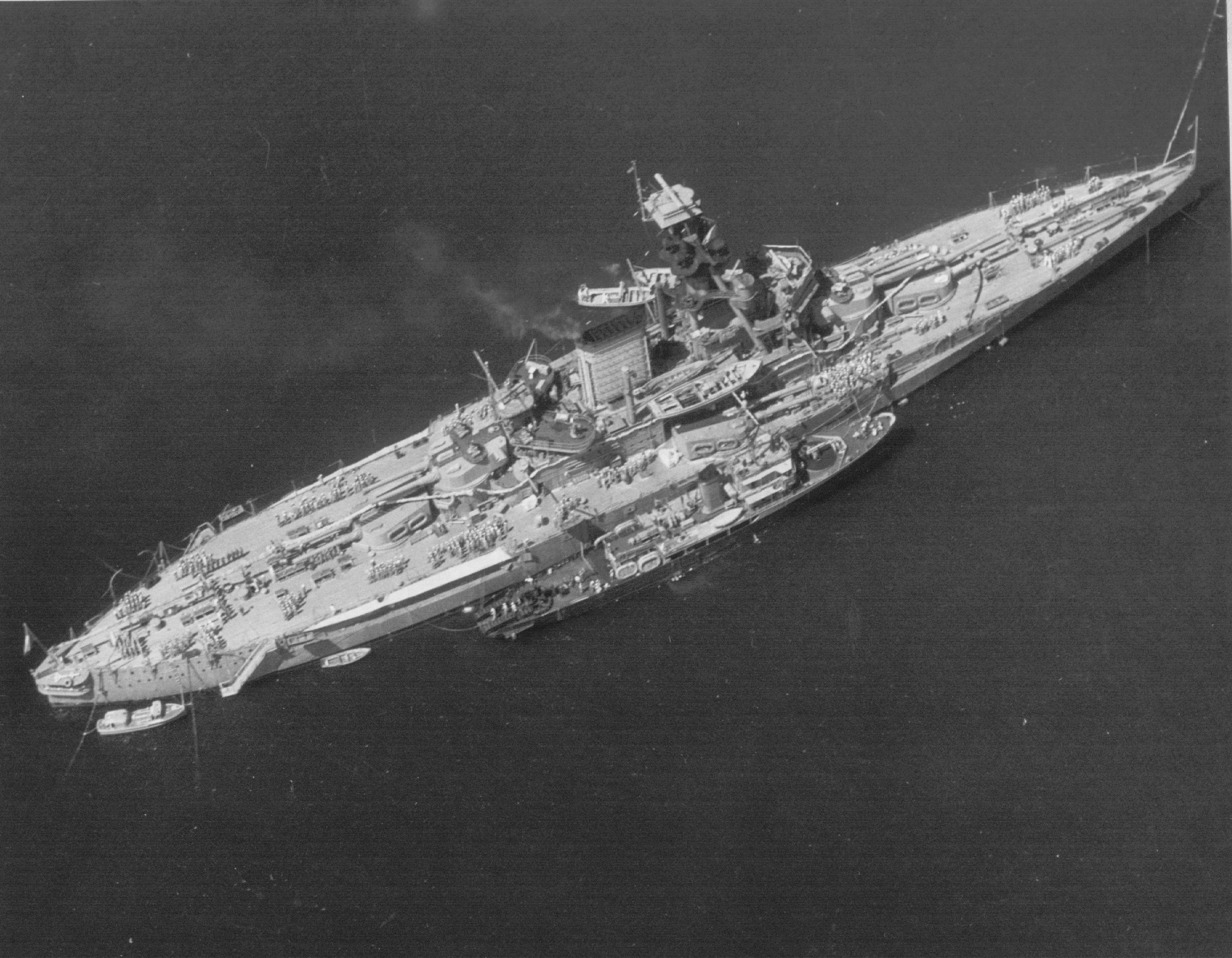
Aerial view of Minas Geraes after modernization

In 1924, Minas Geraes was involved in another mutiny, but remained on the side of the government. First Lieutenant Hercolino Cascardo, seven second lieutenants and others commandeered São Paulo in Rio de Janeiro's harbor on 4 November 1924. Their goal was to force the government to release prisoners who had participated in the 1922 Tenente revolts from confinement aboard the prison ship Cuibaba; the mutineers' demands were not met. São Paulo's boilers were then fired, and the ship "steamed menacingly" around Minas Geraes in an attempt to entice its and other ships to join the rebellion. São Paulo was only able to sway the crew of one old torpedo boat to its cause. Its crew, angry that Minas Geraes would not join them, shot a six-pounder at Minas Geraes, wounding a cook. The mutineers then sailed out of the harbor, exchanging shots with forts at the entrance along the way, and set course for Montevideo, Uruguay. The condensers failed along the way, and they reached Montevideo on 10 November making only 9 knots (10 mph; 17 km/h). The rebellious members of the crew disembarked and were granted asylum, while the remainder re-hoisted the colors of Brazil.

Between June 1931 and April 1938, Minas Geraes was totally reconstructed and modernized at the Rio de Janeiro Naval Yard. It was converted from its old coal–oil combination to all-oil firing. All eighteen of the original Babcock & Wilcox boilers were replaced by six new John I. Thornycroft & Company boilers. The former No. 1 boiler room and all twelve of the side coal bunkers were converted to fuel oil storage tanks; the upper coal bunkers were removed. In addition, Minas Geraes' dynamos were replaced with new turbogenerators. The most striking aesthetic change was the trunking of the boiler uptakes into a single funnel. The fire-control systems that had been fitted after the First World War were also modernized in favor of Zeiss range-finders. The guns were overhauled; two extra 4.7 in (120 mm) guns were added making 14 total, and six 20 mm (0.79 in) Madsen guns were installed, including two on the top of 'X' turret. The maximum elevation of the 12-inch guns was increased from 13° to 18°.

== Second World War and later career ==
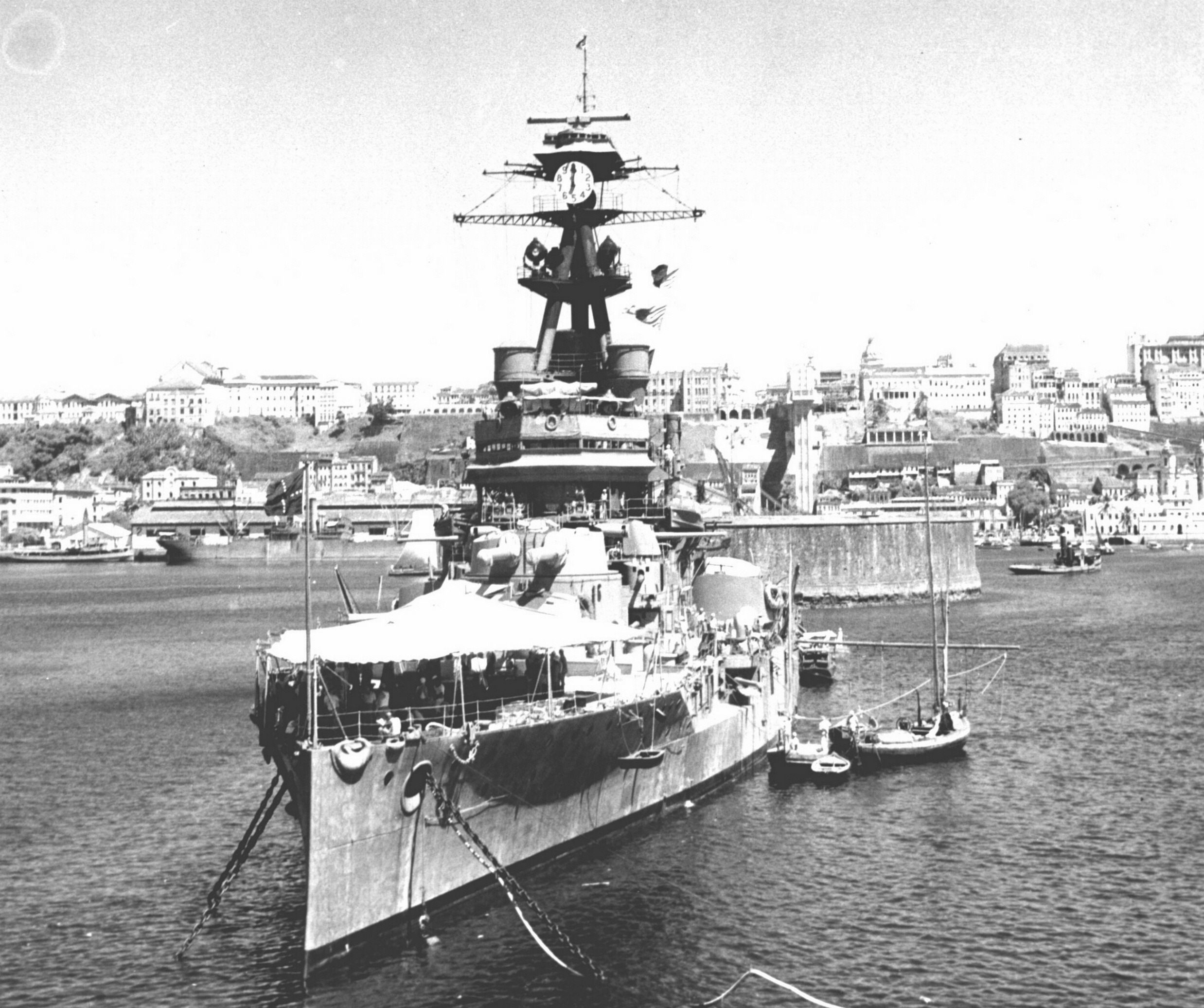
Minas Geraes in Salvador during 1942, after its major refit

As in the First World War, Brazil was neutral during the early years of the Second World War. German attacks on Brazilian merchant ships pushed the country into war on the Allied side; Brazil declared war on 21 August 1942, taking effect on 31 August.

Apart from three destroyers launched in 1940 and four submarines from the inter-war years, (Note: Of the four modern submarines, there was a mine-laying submarine (Humaita) completed in 1927 and three submarines (Tupy, Tamoyo and Tymbira) completed in 1937; all were built by Italy. According to author Robert Schenia, these "were of limited operational value". In addition, five Juruena-class destroyers were laid down in Britain in 1939, but were appropriated for use by the Royal Navy at the start of the war. Another three destroyers, of the Marcílio Dias class, were built in Brazil (and so were not appropriated); these were launched in 1940.) Brazil's warships were old and mostly obsolete pre-First World War vessels. The mainstays of the fleet, Minas Geraes, São Paulo, Bahia, and Rio Grande do Sul, were all over thirty years old. Although Minas Geraes had been further refitted from 1939 to 1943, the ship was still too old and in too poor a condition for any active role in the Second World War; instead, the dreadnought was anchored as a floating battery in the port of Salvador for the duration of the war.

Minas Geraes was inactive for much of the rest of its career. Decommissioned on 16 May 1952, it was used as a stationary headquarters for the Commander-in-Chief of the Brazilian Navy until 17 December of that year. The ship was removed from the naval register on 31 December, and sold to the Italian ship-breaking company SA Cantiere Navale de Santa Maria. Minas Geraes was taken under tow on 1 March 1954 and arrived in Genoa on 22 April; the old dreadnought, which had been in service for more than forty years, was broken up for scrap later that year.

== See also ==
- List of historical ships of the Brazilian Navy
