= Gilbert Evenom Ngolo =

Malagasy politician

Gilbert Evenom Ngolo (born August 17, 1957) is a Malagasy politician. He is a member of the Senate of Madagascar for Menabe, and is a member of the Tiako i Madagasikara party.
