= João Cândido =

Brazilian sailor and revolt leader (1880–1969)

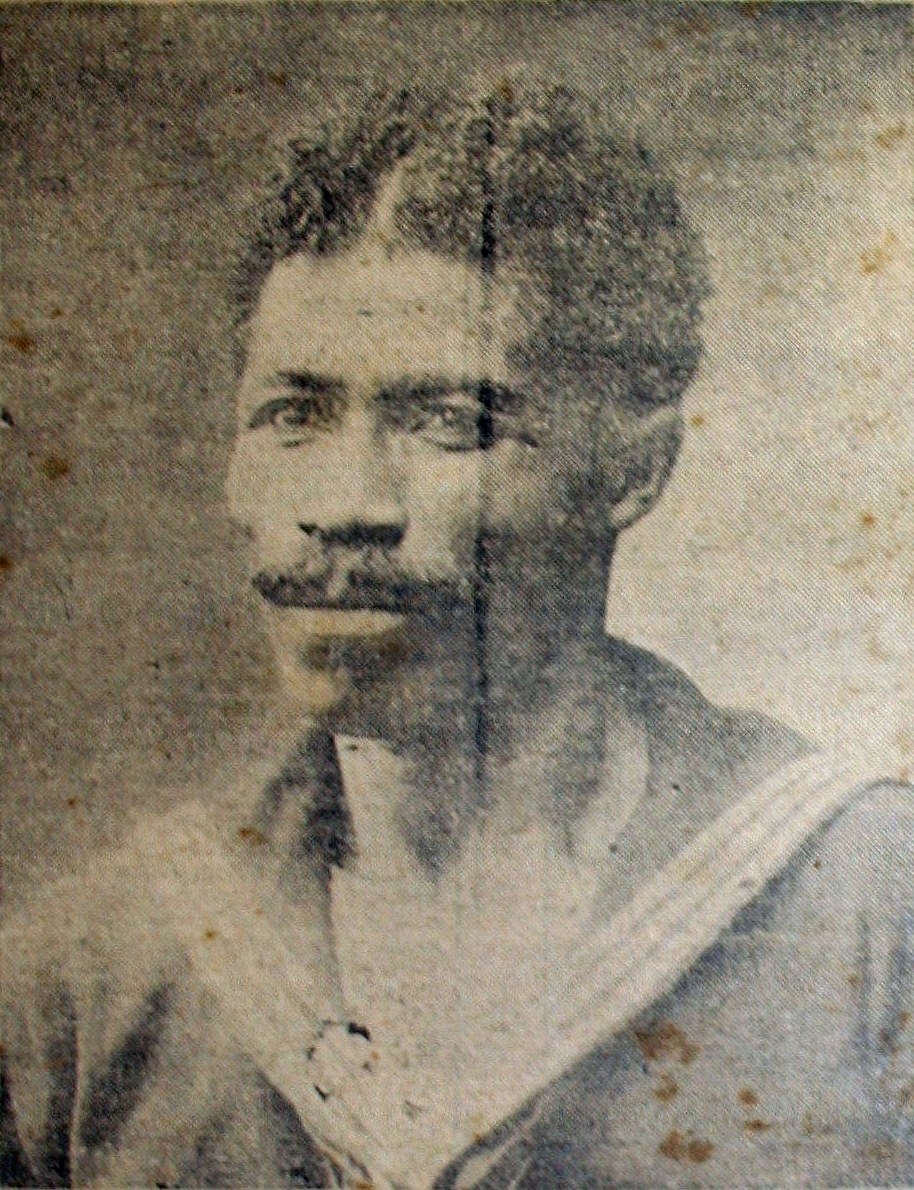
- Felisberto pictured in Gazeta de Notícias, 31 December 1912
- Born: 24 June 1880; Encruzilhada do Sul, Rio Grande do Sul, Empire of Brazil
- Died: 6 December 1969 (aged 89); Jardim Guanabara, Rio de Janeiro, Brazil
- Occupation: First Class Sailor
- Known for: Commander of the Rebel Squadron during the Revolt of the Lash

João Cândido Felisberto (24 June 1880 – 6 December 1969) was a Brazilian sailor, best known as the leader of the 1910 "Revolt of the Lash". His name was sometimes given as simply "João Cândido", or "Jean Candido" in non-Portuguese sources.

== Early life ==
João Cândido Felisberto was born in Encruzilhada do Sul, Rio Grande do Sul, to a poor Afro-Brazilian family 24 June 1880. His father and mother were former slaves. He entered the Brazilian Navy in 1894 at the age of 13.

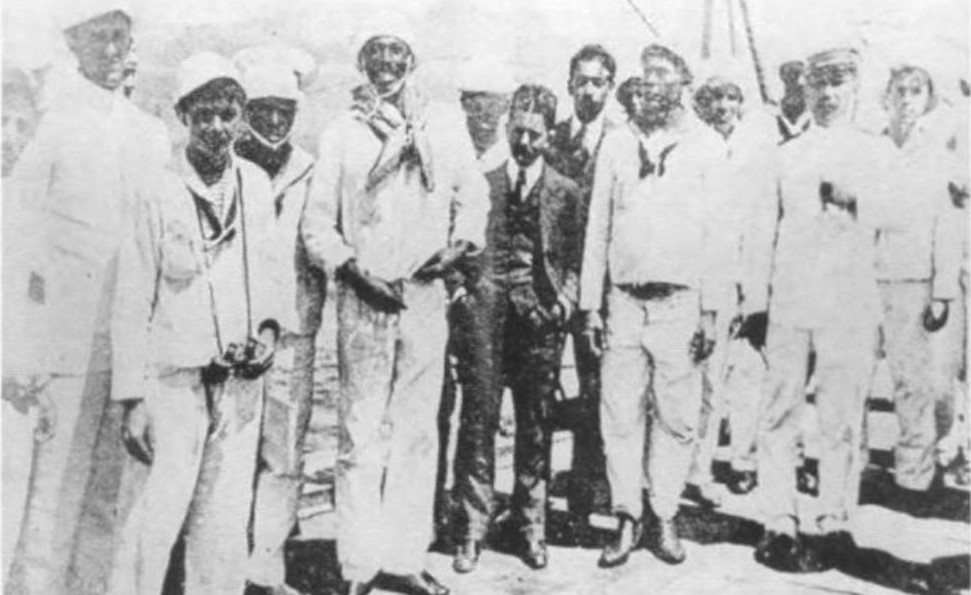
Felisberto with reporters, officers and sailors on the battleship Minas Geraes, 26 November 1910, the last day of the "Revolt of the Lash".

The conditions for Brazilian sailors at the time were harsh, and being black, Felisberto suffered prejudice from the white officers in the Brazilian Navy. Several Brazilian sailors had been sent to Newcastle-Upon-Tyne in England during the two-year period taken for the construction of the dreadnought Minas Geraes. Felisberto arrived there in September 1909 and left in January 1910 as part of the crew of the newly commissioned Minas Geraes. It was while experiencing the living conditions and greater freedoms of Newcastle that Felisberto realised how unacceptable conditions in the Brazilian Navy were.

The sailors had many secret meetings in Rio de Janeiro, planning a strategy to stop the corporal punishment still imposed in the new Navy, which had received two new modern battleships in 1910.

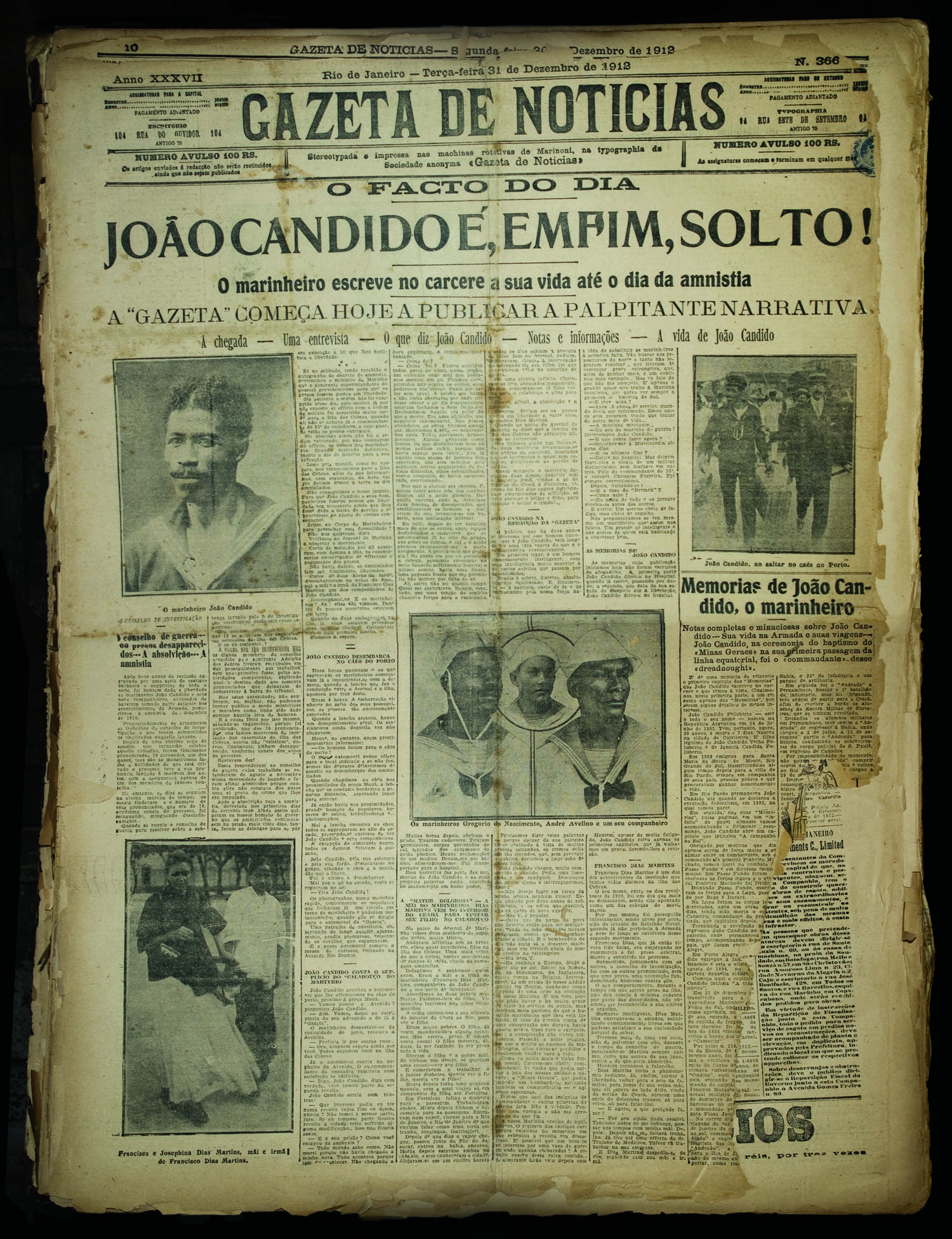
Newspaper headlines from Gazeta de Notícias, 31 December 1912.

In November 1910, the flogging of a sailor, against Navy regulations (250 strokes instead of the allowed 25 strokes), was a contributing factor to the revolt, known in Brazil as "Revolta da Chibata" ("Revolt of the Lash"). Sailors took control of two Brazilian battleships, Minas Geraes and São Paulo, both built in England, as well as two other major warships. Their demands included the abolition of torture as a form of punishment and improved living conditions in the Brazilian Navy. Felisberto was the leader of the movement. The new Brazilian president, Hermes da Fonseca, promised the end of "Chibata" and approved an amnesty, but the government later went back on this promise. In the revolt's aftermath Felisberto and many of his fellow mutineers were either arrested, tortured or murdered in prison. Felisberto himself was tortured, and also contracted tuberculosis, but he recovered after some months and was eventually released. The Brazilian press nicknamed him "Almirante Negro", or the "Black Admiral", for his actions.

== Later life ==
After Cândido's release, he sank into poverty and experienced discrimination, working in a harbor on a very low salary. He was arrested again in 1930 but was soon released. In 1933 he joined the integralist movement. In 1938 an integralist uprising was easily crushed by the Brazilian military, with fewer than twenty deaths, and the group was outlawed.

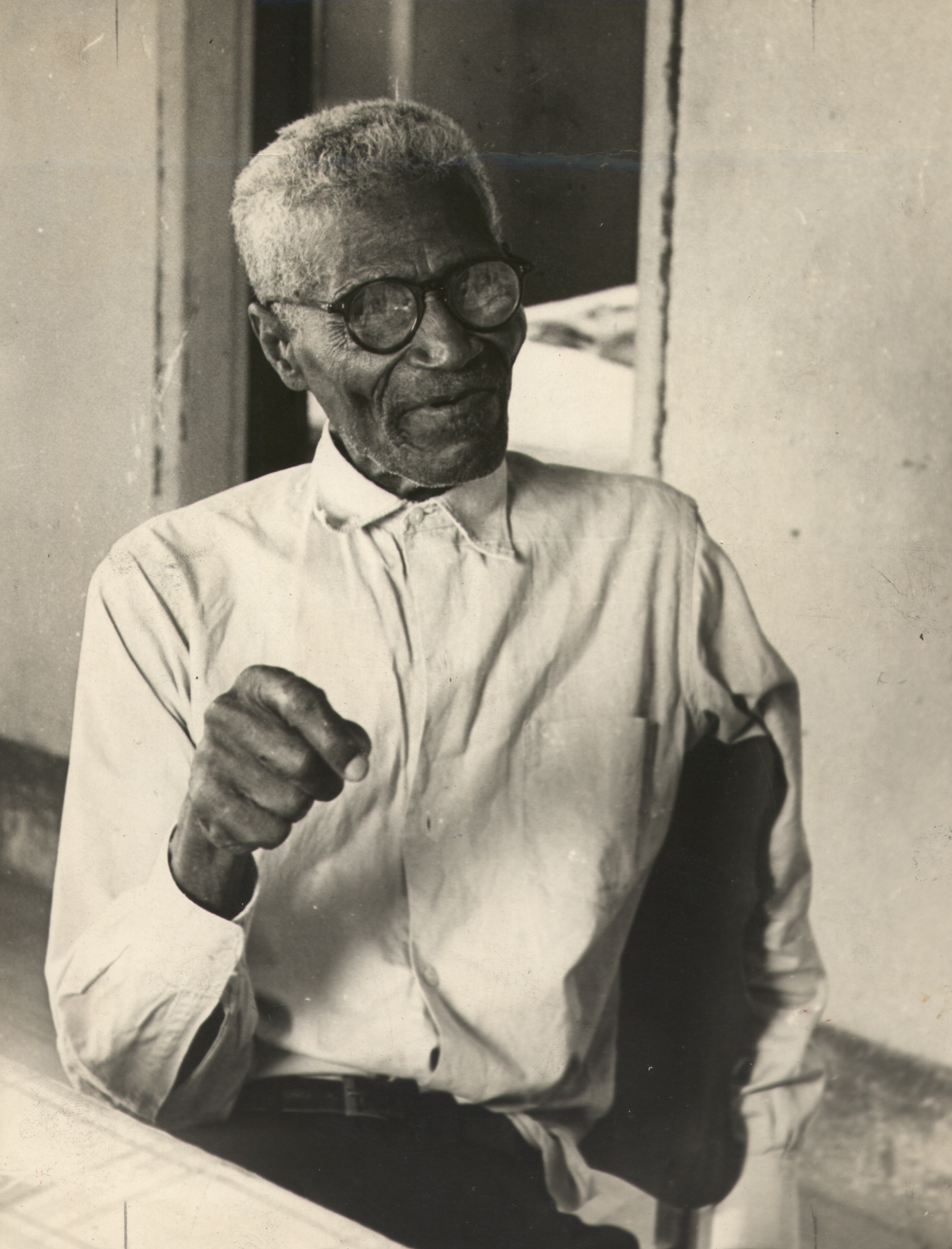
Felisberto, 1963

With Brazil at war with the fascist Axis powers from 1942 onwards, integralism became a small and powerless movement. Germany's defeat in 1945 reduced integralism to very little importance. João Cândido Felisberto said in 1968 that he was proud to be an integralist. After living in ostracism in the Brazilian city of São João de Meriti and being persecuted by the Brazilian Navy, he died of cancer on 6 December 1969 in Rio de Janeiro, at the age of 89.

== Legacy and statue ==
The Lash Uprising, which was sparked by the Brazilian Navy's use of torture, ended with Felisberto and many of his followers imprisoned and tortured. The revolt was cited later by labor organizers as an "heroic example of worker struggle". A statue of João Cândido Felisberto was erected in Rio de Janeiro.

His life was portrayed in a movie, Memórias da Chibata (Chibata Memories), in 2006, retelling his fight against the Lash with actors, and a documentary called Cem Anos Sem Chibata (Cem Anos Sem Chibata), a coproduction with EBC, in 2010. Both productions were written and directed by Marcos Manhães Marins.
