= Brazilian cruiser Benjamin Constant =

Training ship, launched 1892

Benjamin Constant
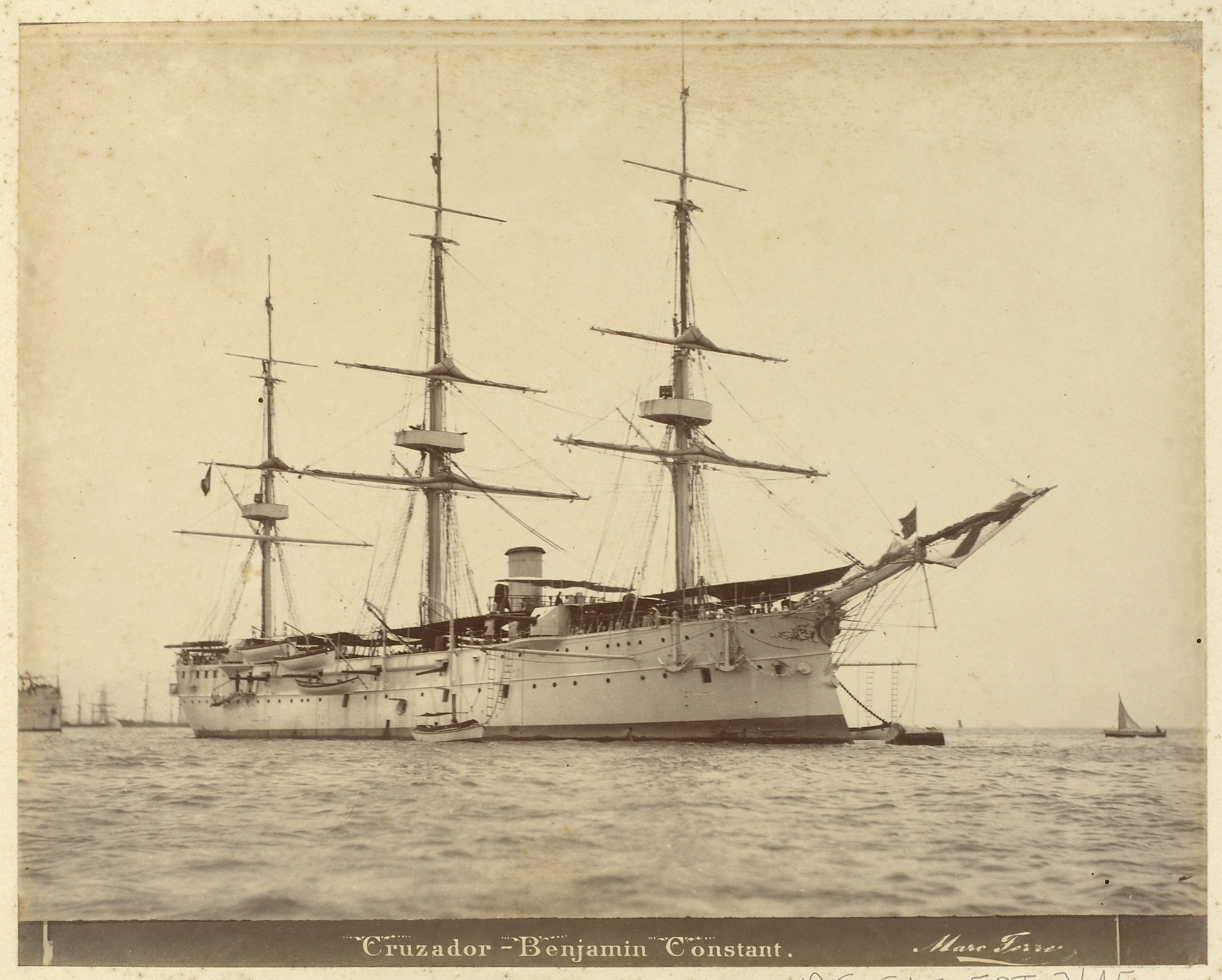

History

Brazil
- Name: Benjamin Constant
- Namesake: Benjamin Constant
- Builder: Société Nouvelle des Forges et Chantiers de la Méditerranée
- Laid down: 18 November 1891
- Launched: 11 November 1892
- Commissioned: 10 May 1894
- Decommissioned: 2 March 1926
- Fate: Dismantled in 1949

General characteristics
- Type: Training ship
- Displacement: 2,311 tons surfaced; 2,750 tons (full)
- Length: 73.93 m (242 ft 7 in)
- Beam: 13.69 m (44 ft 11 in)
- Draught: 5.70 m (18 ft 8 in)
- Installed power: 2,800 ihp (2,100 kW)
- Propulsion: 1-shaft triple expansion engine
- Speed: 14 knots (26 km/h; 16 mph)
- Armament: 4 x 150 mm Armstrong guns; 8 x 120 mm Armstrong guns; 4 x 57 mm Nordenfelt guns; 6 x 25 mm machineguns; 4 x 17 mm machineguns; 4 torpedo launchers

Benjamin Constant was a training ship that belonged to the Benjamin Constant-class of the Brazilian Navy. It was the first ship in the Navy to be named after Brazilian military officer Benjamin Constant and the first to be designed as a purpose-built training ship. Built in 1891 and launched in 1892, it had a 32-year long career, making dozens of instruction trips, and also securing Brazilian possession of Trindade Island. It had the nicknames "Garça Branca" (White Heron) and "Beijoca" (Smack). The ship was discharged from service on 22 February 1926. Its hull was destroyed by a fire in 1938. It was dismantled in 1949.

== General characteristics ==
The ship was named after Brazilian military officer and professor Benjamin Constant, who was one of the main leaders of the 1889 republican coup d'état. It displaced 2,311 tons when empty and 2,750 tons when full. It had a length of 73.93 meters (242 ft 7 in), beam of 13.69 m (44 ft 11 in), a draught of 5.70 m (18 ft 8 in), and a depth of 8.30 m (27 ft 3 in). The ship's propulsion consisted of a triple-expansion engine that generated 2,800 hp (2,100 kW), which allowed it to reach 14 knots (26 km/h; 16 mph). It was nicknamed "Garça Branca" and "Beijoca" by its sailors.

Its armament consisted of four 150-millimeter Armstrong guns placed on two barbettes (one on the forecastle and one on the bridge), eight 120-millimeter Armstrong guns, four 57-millimeter Nordenfelt guns (two at the stern and two on the bow), six 25-millimeter machine guns, four 17-millimeter machine guns, and four torpedo launcher tubes.

The ship's deck was protected by thirty to fifty-millimeter-thick plates while its gangway was protected by eighty-millimeter-thick plates. The hull was made of wood covered with copper and steel plates.

== History ==
=== Early years ===
Benjamin Constant's keel was laid on 18 November 1891 at the Forges et chantiers de la Méditerranée shipyard in La Seyne, Toulon, being launched the following year, on 11 November 1892. Still unfinished, it was tasked with providing accommodation for the crew of the cruiser Almirante Barroso, which had sunk in the Red Sea when returning to Brazil in 1893. Although the ship was launched in 1892, it was only incorporated into the Brazilian Navy on 10 May 1894, as a consequence of the Navy revolt. Once construction was finished and the ship was delivered, it was taken over by frigate captain Antonio Alves Câmara, who departed from La Seyne on 18 July, arriving in Rio de Janeiro on 4 September.

From 18 February to 13 March 1895, the ship made a cruise starting in the state of Bahia. When the cruise was over, Joaquim José Rodrigues Torres Sobrinho took over as frigate captain. He commanded another cruise going as far as Pará, visiting Trindade Island in order to secure Brazilian presence in the region that was being disputed with the United Kingdom.

In 1897, the ship conducted another instruction cruise to Europe and the United States. It was part of the Instruction Division, whose commanders were rear admirals Afonso de Alencastro Graça and Joaquim Marques Leão. In 1898, frigate captain Duarte Huet de Bacelar assumed command of the ship. Bacelar's first action as commander was to travel along the Brazilian coast, stopping at Trindade Island, Fernando de Noronha and Belém in Pará.

=== 1901–1908 ===
In 1901, the ship undertook another instructional cruise, traveling to Recife, Barbados, New York, Plymouth, and Cherbourg. During the trip, frigate captain José Martins de Toledo suffered from an unknown illness and was replaced by chief mate and lieutenant captain Carlos Pereira Lima. On 24 December 1906, he returned to Rio de Janeiro, ending the instruction of the class of 1906. On this trip, the ship visited the ports of Salvador, São Vicente, São Miguel dos Açores, Plymouth, Antwerp, Kristiansand, Copenhagen, Stockholm, Kiel, Willenshaven, Amsterdam, Le Havre, Cherbourg, Lisbon, and Las Palmas.

On 22 January 1908, Benjamin Constant sailed with fourteen newly trained second lieutenants. This was the third time a Brazilian ship set sail on a circumnavigation trip. The places visited were: Uruguay, Chile, Peru, Hawaii, Japan, China, Hong Kong, Singapore, Ceylon, Aden, Egypt, Italy, France, Gibraltar, and Recife, returning to Rio de Janeiro on 16 December. It took in twenty Japanese castaways from the Toyoshima Maru on this voyage, remaining in repair from 7 to 8 November during its docking in Toulon.

=== 1909–1913 ===
In 1909, Benjamin Constant transported the crew of the battleship Minas Geraes to Newcastle (where the battleship was being built). In 1910, the ship represented Brazil at the centennial of Mexico's independence. From 12 to 16 February 1913, it was docked at Ilha das Cobras to have some of its copper plates replaced. During this period, Benjamin Constant received a group of fourth-year students from the Naval School to prepare for their next instruction cruise. The training ship left Ilha das Cobras on 20 February, passing through Pernambuco and Bahia, and returning on 15 March.

In April, after a supply ship was delayed, Benjamin Constant was requested by the government to transport the supplies to the Rocas Atoll Lighthouse which had notified an English merchant ship passing by of the delay in supplies. This merchant ship relayed the message to the government.

On 5 May, the ship made another training cruise. This time, with a group of second lieutenants, it sailed from Rio de Janeiro, passing through Recife from 12 to 16 May; Belém from 22 to 27 May; Barbados from 2 to 8 June; Santiago de Cuba from 14 to 21 June; New York from 28 June to 13 July, and Plymouth from 28 to 30 July. After spending four days in Devenport Bay, the vessel sailed to Portsmouth, arriving there on 3 August and staying until 24 August. It returned to Amsterdam from 25 August to 2 September; Cherbourg from 4 to 13 September; Brest from 14 to 26 September; Lisbon from 30 September to 10 October; Las Palmas from 14 to 18 October; and Recife from 1 to 7 November, returning to Rio de Janeiro on 12 November.

=== Fate ===
From 1914 to 1915, Benjamin Constant was in regular condition, but in 1916 its trips began to consist of only short instruction cruises within Brazilian territory. Benjamin Constant was removed from active service on 22 February 1926 under Notice No. 578, as it was already obsolete and worn out due to its several instruction trips. The ship became, under Notice No. 643, the headquarters of the Auxiliary-Specialist Schools. In 1938, it suffered a fire. Eleven years later, it was dismantled in the Santos Estuary.

== See also ==
- List of historical ships of the Brazilian Navy
