= Navita Ngolo =

Angolan politician

Albertina Essenje Navemba Felisberto Ngolo a.k.a. Navita Ngolo is an Angolan politician for UNITA and a member of the National Assembly of Angola.
