= Brazilian cruiser Tymbira =

Brazilian warship

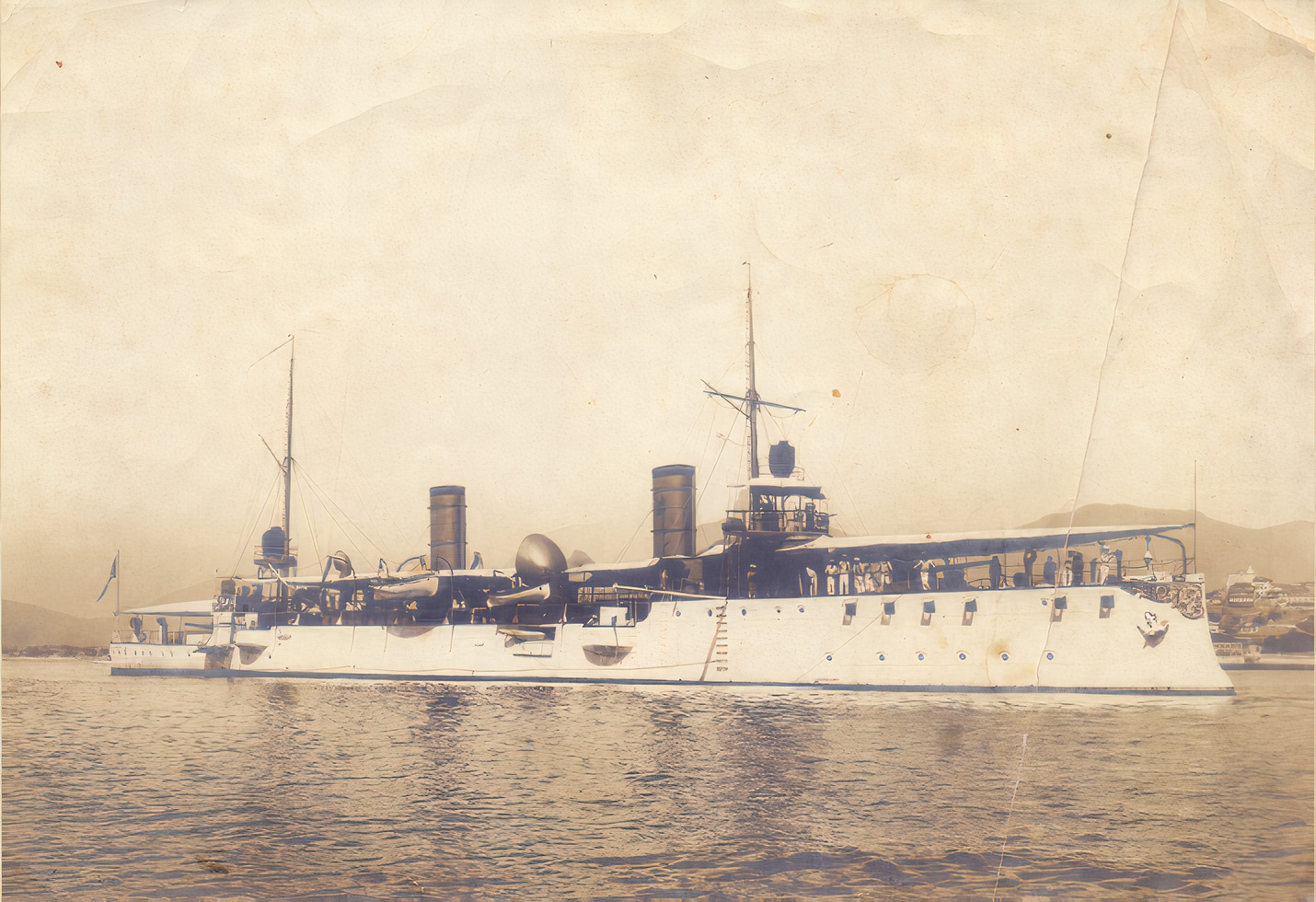
- Tymbira

History

Brazil
- Name: Tymbira
- Namesake: Timbira people
- Owner: Brazilian Navy
- Builder: AG Vulcan Stettin
- Launched: 1 April 1896
- Commissioned: 26 January 1896
- Decommissioned: 30 November 1917

General characteristics
- Class & type: Tupi-class torpedo cruiser
- Displacement: 1,190 tonnes (1,170 long tons; 1,310 short tons)
- Length: 79.35 m (260 ft 4 in)
- Beam: 9.40 m (31 ft)
- Draft: 2.97 m (9 ft 9 in)
- Installed power: 7,693 ihp (5,737 kW)
- Propulsion: 2 × triple-expansion steam engines; 2 × screw propellers
- Speed: 22.5 knots (41.7 km/h; 25.9 mph)
- Armament: 2 × 101mm Armstrong guns; 6 × 57mm Maxim Nordenfelt guns; 2 × 37mm Maxim Nordenfelt guns; 2 × 7mm Maxim Nordenfelt machine guns; 2 × 452 mm (17.8 in) torpedo tubes

Tymbira was a torpedo cruiser operated by the Brazilian Navy, belonging to the Tupi-class along with Tamoio and Tupi. During the First World War it patrolled the Brazilian coast. It was dismissed from service on 30 November 1917.

== Construction and design ==
Tymbira was built by the Stettin shipyard, in Kiel, Germany, and was launched on 1 April 1896. Its name is a tribute to the Timbiras, a Brazilian indigenous people who inhabited the current territory of the state of Maranhão. It was the first Tupi class torpedo cruiser commissioned in the Brazilian navy. The incorporation took place on 26 January 1896. The ship was built with a maximum displacement of 1,190 tons, 79.35 m in length, 9.40 m in beam, 5 m in depth and 2.97 m in draft. Its propulsion system consisted of two steam engines that generated 7,693 hp of power and propelled the vessel up to 22.5 knots. It was armed with two 101mm Armstrong guns, six 57mm Nordenfelt guns, two 37mm Maxim guns, two 7mm Maxim machine guns and two 452mm torpedo tubes.

== Service ==
In May 1905, it is recorded that Tymbira sailed to Manaus in formation with other Brazilian vessels. In 1910 it carried out naval exercises in Rio de Janeiro. By the end of 1913, it was with the fleet of the São Sebastião Island Squadron, for naval exercises, formed by the battleships Minas Geraes, São Paulo, Floriano and Deodoro; the cruisers Almirante Barroso, Bahia and Rio Grande do Sul, the torpedo cruisers Tamoio and Tupi, the destroyers Amazonas, Pará, Piauí, Rio Grande do Norte, Alagoas, Paraíba, Sergipe, Paraná, and Santa Catarina. During the First World War, it patrolled the Brazilian coast between the ports of the northern region and Rio de Janeiro. It was decommissioned on 30 November 1917.

== See also ==
- List of historical ships of the Brazilian Navy
