= Brazilian Navy in World War II =

From 1942 to 1945

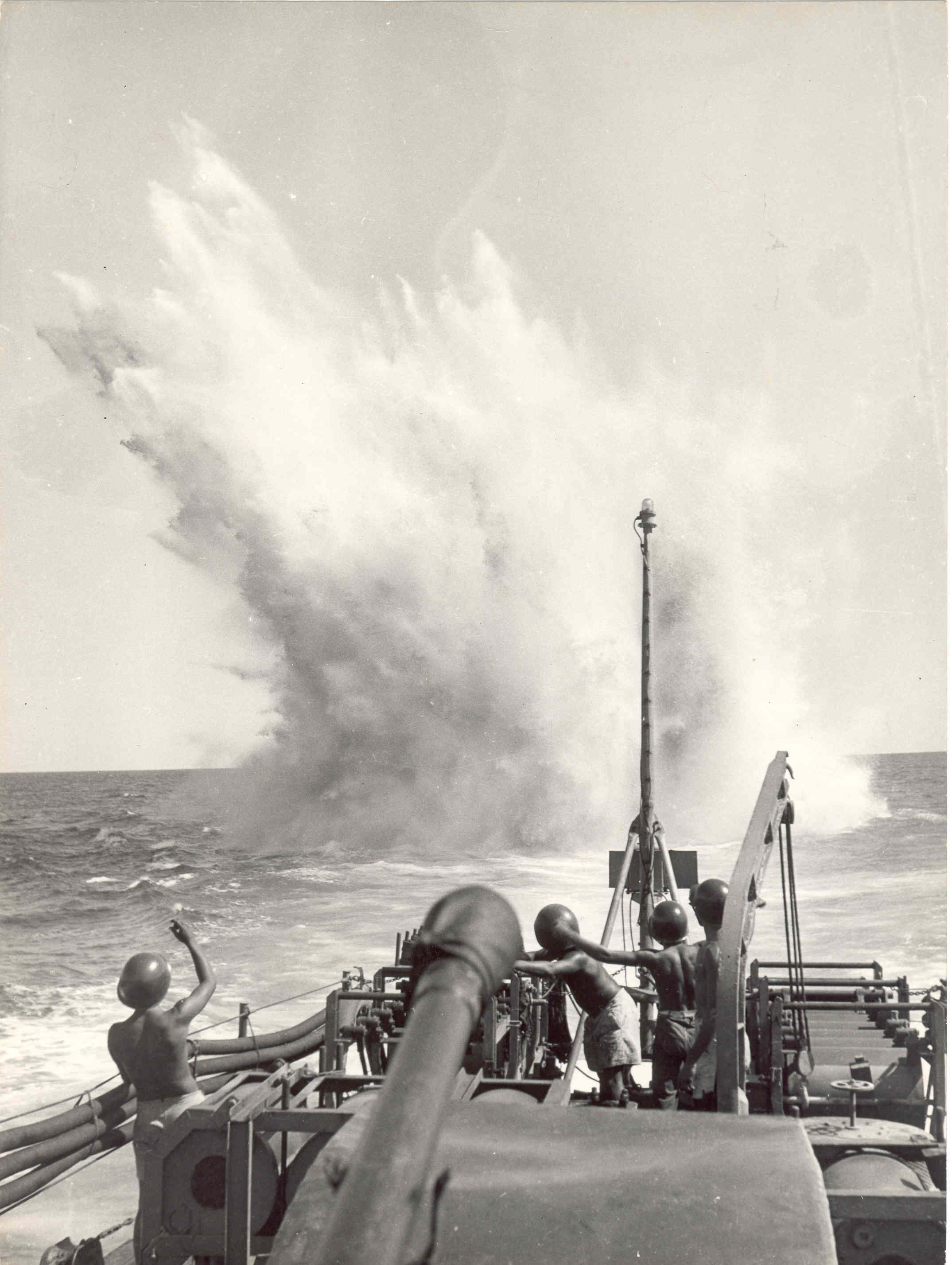
Submarine chaser Guajará during a depth-charge exercise (1944)

The Brazilian Navy participated in World War II in the Battle of the Atlantic, from Brazil's entry into the war in 1942 until its end in 1945. Its campaign consisted of defending maritime traffic against German and Italian submarines, in conjunction with the Brazilian Air Force and the United States Armed Forces, with the latter exercising operational command in the South Atlantic. Its main activities included escorting convoys between Rio de Janeiro and Trinidad in the Caribbean, with additional missions such as escorting the Brazilian Expeditionary Force on its way to Europe.

Submarine attacks against the Brazilian merchant navy were the immediate factor in Brazil's entry into the war and threatened the supply of raw materials to the Allies and the provisioning of major coastal cities. The pre-war Brazilian fleet, consisting mostly of remnants of the Fleet of 1910, was unprepared for anti-submarine warfare. Naval strategists were, until then, more concerned with a regional war between surface forces. A naval program outlined in 1932 reactivated, albeit with difficulty, the construction of warships on national soil. During the war, the adaptation of existing ships, the incorporation, through Lend-Lease, of sixteen submarine chasers (the G and J classes) and eight escort destroyers (the Bertioga class), and training on new equipment created a fleet geared towards anti-submarine warfare, with small but modern ships.

Two task forces were organized: the Northeastern Naval Force (FNNE) and the Southern Patrol Group (GPS), operating respectively north and south of Rio de Janeiro, with other resources assigned to the Naval Commands on the coast. Brazilian Marines garrisoned several ports and Trindade Island. With the combined Allied effort, the submarine threat was almost suppressed by the end of 1943. The Brazilian Navy convoyed 3,164 ships, of which 99.01% reached their destinations. Three ships and 486 military personnel were lost in operation. No enemy submarines were directly sunk by the Brazilian Navy; aviation, which it lacked, was the main destroyer of submarines in operations. Brazilian naval participation in hunter-killer missions would only begin in the final stage of the war.

In the post-war period, the Brazilian Navy aligned itself with the United States in the acquisition of ships and joint preparation for anti-submarine warfare, with Soviet submarines replacing German ones in Cold War naval thinking. A divergence on both points would occur a few decades later. The navy's institutional historical narrative on the conflict opposes the view that only focuses on the Brazilian Army and blames political neglect for the state of unpreparedness and improvisation in which the country found itself.

== The pre-war Navy ==
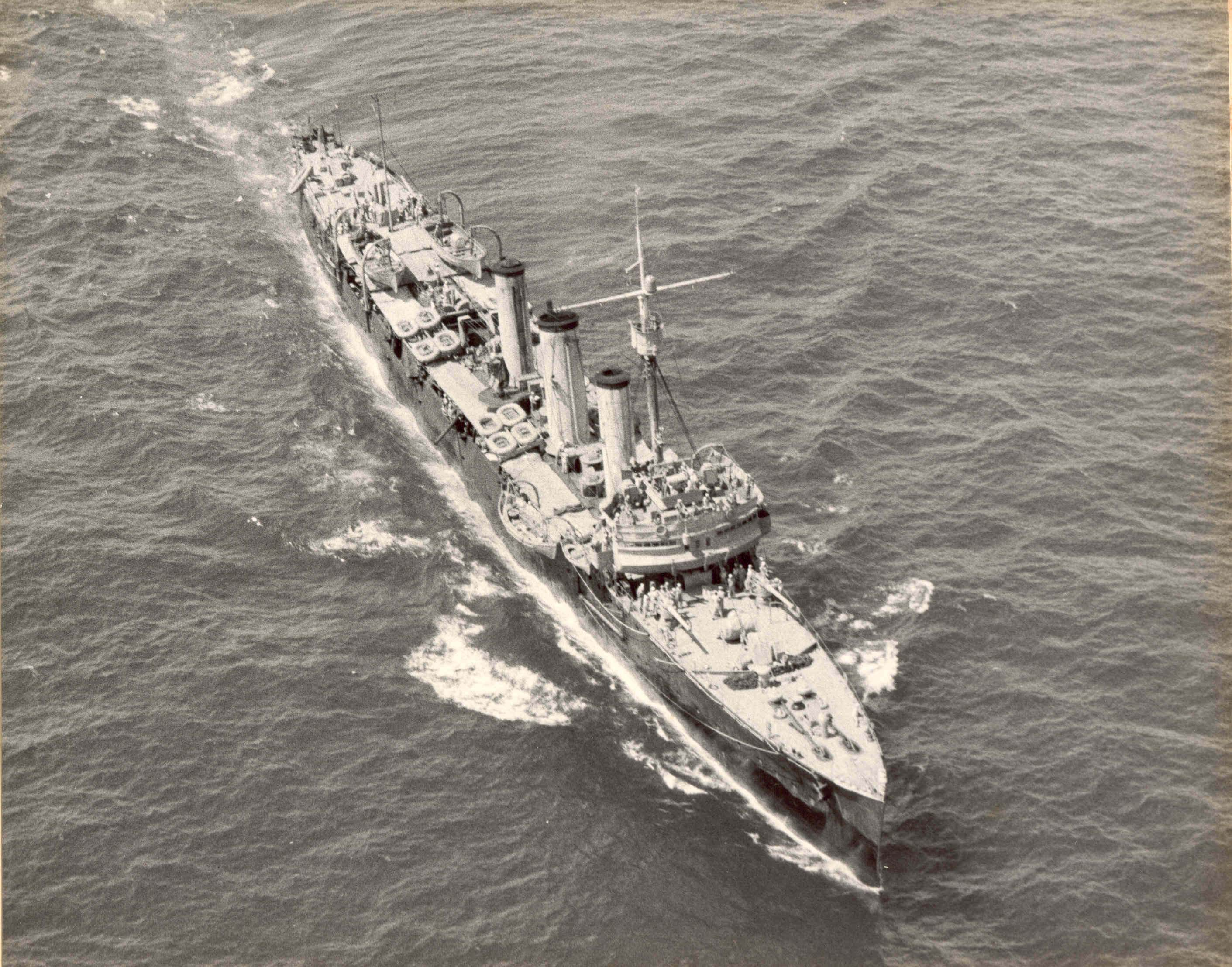
Cruiser Bahia

The Brazilian government declared itself neutral after the outbreak of World War II in Europe in September 1939, and declared war on Germany and Italy in August 1942, entering the conflict on the Allied side. At sea, the threat consisted of Axis submarines (German and Italian) sinking Brazilian merchant ships. The Brazilian Navy was unprepared for this threat. Most of the ships were remnants of the Fleet of 1910, used in World War I. Their state of maintenance was very poor and ammunition stocks were small.

Most assets were subordinate to the Fleet, whose flagship was the battleship Minas Geraes. Its sister ship São Paulo, another remnant of 1910, remained in service, as did the cruisers Bahia and Rio Grande do Sul and five destroyers of the Pará class, one of which, the Paraíba, was not seaworthy. There was another destroyer of a more recent class, that is, from the First World War, Maranhão. Minas Geraes had been refitted in 1935–1939, replacing coal with oil. The cruisers, with a displacement of three thousand tons, were only slightly larger than modern destroyers, and their guns were of 120 mm caliber, below the 127 mm standard of U.S. destroyers. The Pará class destroyers were referred to as torpedo boats in some sources.

The high seas force also included the submarine Humaytá and three T class submarines, two tenders, two tankers and four tugboats. The Minesweeping Flotilla had ten ships, and the Directorate of Hydrography and Navigation had three hydrographic vessels and two lighthouse tenders. The training ship was the sailing ship Almirante Saldanha. These assets were concentrated in Rio de Janeiro, then Brazil's federal capital, but there were river flotillas in Ladário, Mato Grosso, and Belém, Pará. A naval base was under construction in Natal, and others were being considered in Recife and Salvador for operations in Northeastern Brazil. The coastline was patrolled with the few available assets, especially between the mouth of the Pará River and Santa Catarina, including the archipelagos of Fernando de Noronha and Trindade and Martim Vaz.

There was no knowledge or equipment for modern anti-submarine tactics. The ships lacked radar and sonar, and crews were not trained in modern damage control techniques, firefighting, sea rescue, and other procedures. The routine training of battleships in the interwar period was limited to occasional gunnery exercises at Ilha Grande, returning to port the same day. Officers who wished to serve longer at sea volunteered for hydrographic service. There were pockets of expertise in the Submarine Flotilla and Naval Aviation, but the latter was disbanded in 1941, along with its Army counterpart, to create the Brazilian Air Force. Until then, it possessed 97 aircraft.

The Corps of Naval Fusiliers (CFN) had a nominal strength of 2,638 men since 1940. It was essentially a guard infantry with typical Army procedures. The regulations stipulated that they should carry out amphibious landing operations, but there was no equipment or specialized training for such. With the opening of courses at the Naval School for marine and supply officers in 1936, officers promoted from the ranks, who were looked down upon by the Navy Corps, were replaced in the CFN.

=== Order of battle ===
Organization of naval units in 1940
Battleship Division	Minas Geraes and São Paulo
Cruiser Division	Rio Grande do Sul and Bahia
Destroyer Flotilla	Maranhão, Piauí, Rio Grande do Norte, Sergipe, Santa Catarina and Mato Grosso
Submarine Flotilla	Humaytá, Tupy, Tymbira and Tamoyo
Auxiliary fleet	Tenders Belmonte and Ceará, tankers Novais de Abreu and Marajó, tugboats Aníbal de Mendonça, Muniz Freire, Henrique Perdigão and DNOG
Minesweeping Flotilla	Ten ships
Directorate of Hydrography and Navigation Flotilla	Three hydrographic vessels and two lighthouse tenders
Training ship	Almirante Saldanha
Amazon Flotilla (river)	Gunboat Amapá and tugboat Mário Alves
Mato Grosso Flotilla (river)	Monitors Parnaíba, Paraguaçu and Pernambuco, avisos Oiapoque and Voluntários and tanker Potengi

=== Interwar naval thought ===
Brazilian naval policy in the interwar period lacked a well-defined orientation. General priorities were centered on the regional scenario, especially the rivalry with Argentina, and on surface operations and units. Naval acquisitions were justified on the basis of defending the eight thousand kilometers of coastline and maintaining parity with the Argentine and Chilean fleets. The Naval War School (EGN) studied hypotheses of a South American conflict with interceptions, protection of bases, transport of Army troops, and the maintenance of maritime communication lines to Europe and the United States. Anti-submarine, however, was ignored. As for fleet composition, proponents of battleships competed with advocates of smaller vessels. Wargames in the 1930s already included aviation, amphibious landings, and wars against European powers, but the enemies employed only surface forces.

The period was marked by economic difficulties and profound reforms. Strategic thinking and tactics were modified by the influence of the North American Naval Mission (MNNA) on the Naval War School (EGN) and the Navy General Staff. Low-ranking officers who had trained in the U.S., the so-called "archdukes," proposed updates to naval thinking. The MNNA contract was signed in 1922, abandoned in 1931, and resumed in 1935. American instructors taught at the EGN. The United States Navy supplanted the British Royal Navy as the main influence on the Brazilian Navy.

=== Naval administration in the Vargas Era ===
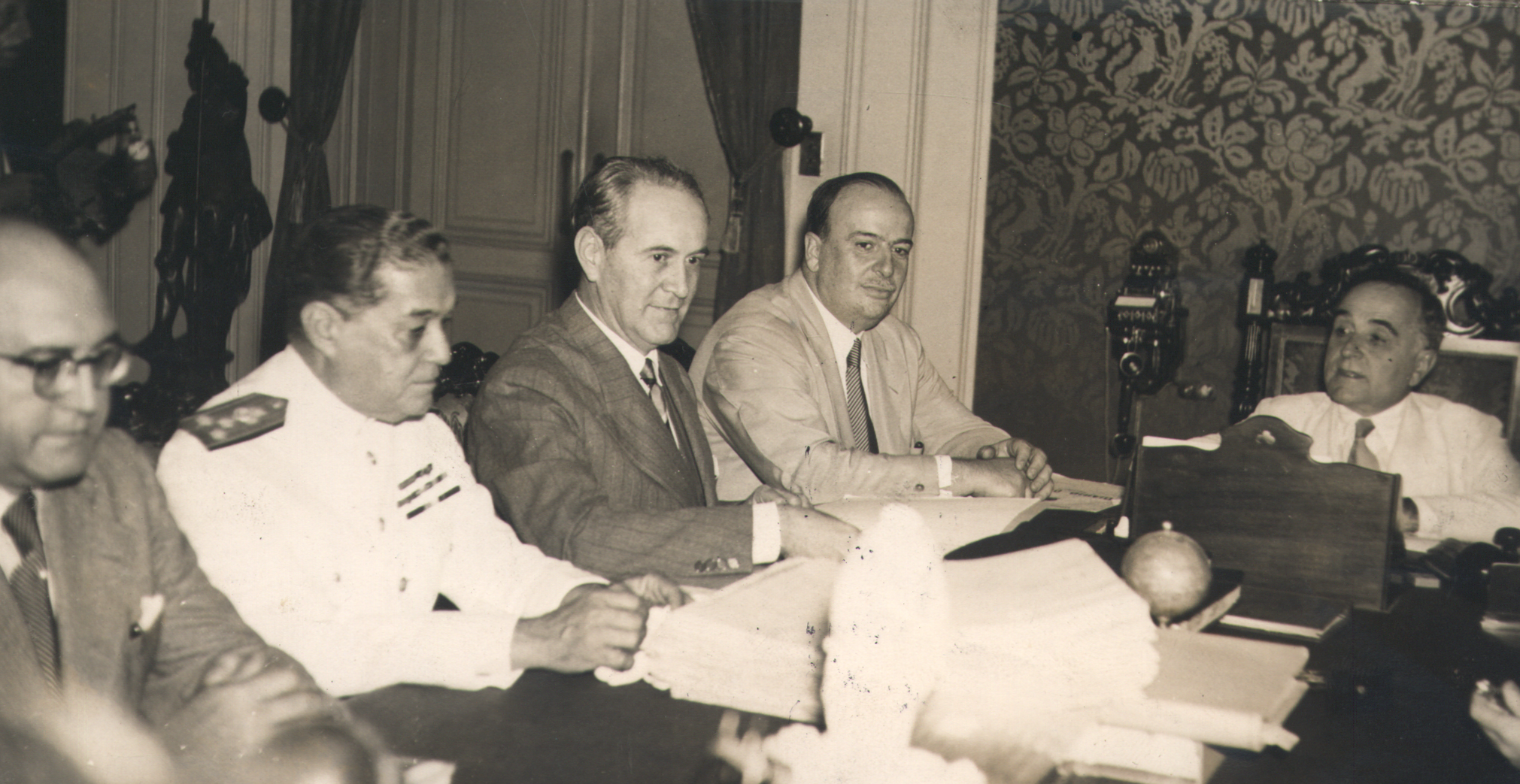
Admiral Aristides Guilhem (in white uniform) with Vargas (on the right) and other ministers (1939)

The Presidency of Brazil was held by Getúlio Vargas from 1930 to 1945. From 1937 onward, Vargas headed, with the support of the Armed Forces, the Estado Novo dictatorship. For most of this period, the Ministry of the Navy was headed by Admirals Protógenes Guimarães (1931–1935) and Aristides Guilhem (1935–1945). Guimarães was one of the former tenentist rebels of the 1920s, amnestied by the president in one of his first measures upon taking power. In the Navy, those pardoned were few and their reintegration was not as difficult as in the Army. Guilhem' long tenure ensured some continuity in naval plans, as decision-making was centralized and personalistic, despite the advisory structure of the Navy General Staff and the American naval mission. The president could choose whether or not to implement the planning presented by the military.

The naval force fought the Constitutionalist Revolution of 1932, contributing to Vargas' stay in power, but many officers sympathized with the rebels. Vargas eventually released funds to the Navy as he needed military support, even amid the Great Depression, and due to foreign policy needs, with two wars in neighboring countries: Colombia-Peru (1932–1933) and Bolivia-Paraguay (1932–1935). The project to reactivate Brazilian shipbuilding was compatible with the government's import-substitution industrialization policy. Steel for shipbuilding was imported from the United States, drawing the ministers' interest to the cause of nationalizing the steel industry. The Estado Novo propaganda exploited keel-laying and launching ceremonies, presenting them as affirmations of nationality, modernity, and development.

Two more movements attempted to overthrow Vargas in the 1930s: the Communists, in 1935, and the Integralists, in 1938. The former did not directly involve the Navy, whereas the latter resulted in the imprisonment of many of its officers and enlisted men. In response, Vargas did not reduce the naval program, but restricted the fuel and ammunition available to the Fleet until 1942. A presidential decision would prove controversial within the Navy: the dissolution of the Army and Navy aviations services to create a new military ministry, the Ministry of Aeronautics, which redistributed the bases of political-military support.

=== 1932 naval program ===
At the outbreak of war in 1939, Brazilian shipyards were working on one monitor, six minelayers, and three destroyers. Another monitor of the same origin had entered service in 1937. Six destroyers, ordered by the Brazilian Navy, were under construction in the United Kingdom, and three Italian submarines had already been commissioned a few years earlier. All were part of a naval program instituted in 1932 and revised in subsequent years. Only a small part of the planned program would actually be implemented in the 1930s.

To finance the program, the government approved, on 11 June 1932, annual credits of 40 billion réis over ten years. The objective was a modest naval force, within the country's financial and technical capabilities. There was no strategic or political planning, only a concern to reduce inferiority to the Argentine and Chilean navies. The official diagnosis in the Ministry of the Navy's 1932 report was that the "fleet is agonizing from age and, having lost the habit of voyages–replaced by the parasitic and bureaucratic life of the ports–all traditions are dying".

The original proposal was to purchase abroad two cruisers, nine destroyers, four submarines, two minelaying submarines, six minelayers and three tankers. The acquisitions were hampered by international naval limitation agreements and the lack of hard currency or gold. In the United States, legislation restricted exports and foreign policy sought to maintain a balance between the South American powers, denying, for example, the supply of eight destroyers due to protests from the Argentine government. The alternative was to build domestically, reviving a dormant industry: the last modern warship of Brazilian design and construction had been the cruiser Tamandaré, in 1890. Since then, imports had been the main means of acquiring ships, including those of the Fleet of 1910. Brazil was a country with few industries, though undergoing relatively rapid industrialization.

The main industrial facility was the new Navy Arsenal, under construction on Ilha das Cobras, in Rio de Janeiro, since the 1920s. The keel laying of the monitor Parnaíba, in June 1936, marked the resumption of Brazilian shipbuilding after decades of neglect. An abandoned hull was used for another monitor, Paraguaçu. Six minelayers, the Carioca class, were to be built in Brazil, six destroyers, the Javari class, in the United Kingdom, and six submarines, the Perla/Tupi class, in Italy.

The Italian case was a move to diversify suppliers, in which Brazil circumvented the shortage of foreign exchange by paying directly in agricultural products. Germany supplied machinery to the Navy Arsenal, and Italy supplied the submarines, delivered in 1938 after the personal intervention of Benito Mussolini to secure the sale. The United States reacted to the growing Italian and German commercial advance in Brazil. Circumventing its own export difficulties, it sold the construction plans for the Mahan class at a symbolic price. In Brazil, these became the three destroyers of the Marcílio Dias class, whose keels were laid in 1937. By 1938, the plan had grown to include three cruisers, eighteen destroyers, nine submarines, and twelve minelayers. On the horizon was the prospect of building a cruiser and submarines in Brazil.

== Entry into the war ==
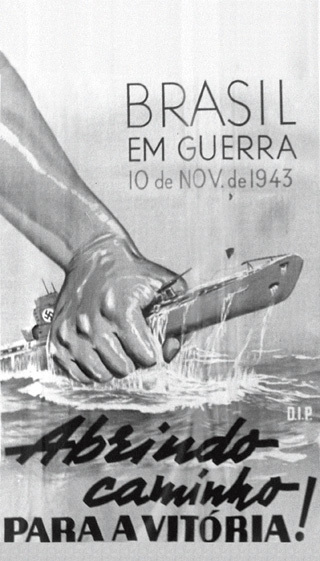
The war against German submarines in a 1943 propaganda poster

Since 1939 there had been signs that hostilities would reach Brazil. The Axis was interested in cutting off Brazil's supply of raw materials to the U.S. and Great Britain, although maritime traffic off the Brazilian coast was of secondary importance: the main theater of submarine operations was off the east coast of the United States. The Americans feared a Brazilian alignment with the Axis and attempted to negotiate bases on Brazilian territory. The Brazilian and American navies had better relations than the armies of the two countries, and opinion in the Brazilian Navy favored the Allies, but it had less political influence than the Brazilian Army.

If diplomacy failed, there was an American plan to invade Brazil. It was projected that the Brazilian Navy would be incapable of offering significant resistance. Likewise, in the event of an Axis campaign, Brazil would be vulnerable. It would be easy for enemy submarines to enter Guanabara Bay and the Bay of All Saints, which had no anti-submarine defenses, to sink the ships anchored there. Maritime trade was the lifeblood of the Brazilian economy, due to a lack of communication between the major urban centers. Coastal cities north of Rio de Janeiro–Vitória, Salvador, Maceió, Recife, Natal, Fortaleza, São Luís, and Belém–were in effect islands. Nothing moved between them without passing through the Atlantic.

At the Havana Conference of 1940, representatives of the countries of the Americas established a maritime security zone around the continent. Based on this guideline, U.S. Navy "neutrality patrols" began frequenting the port of Recife in May 1941 and established a naval base there in October. The U.S. entered the war on 7 December 1941. On the 10th, American maritime patrols were already departing from Natal, and by the end of the month, the U.S. was already transferring depth charges to Brazilian ships.

In January 1942, Brazil severed diplomatic and commercial relations with the Axis powers, created a naval cooperation commission with the U.S., and transferred the Cruiser Division and some minelayers to Recife to maintain contact with the American forces led by Admiral Jonas H. Ingram. From February to August 1942, Axis submarines torpedoed seventeen Brazilian cargo ships, tankers and transports, among them the Baependy, which was carrying part of the Army's 7th Coastal Artillery Group. It had no naval escort, as the two forces did not usually cooperate and the Navy lacked anti-submarine means.

The sinkings culminated in the declaration of war by the Brazilian government. The threat hung over the supply of the major coastal cities. Disruptions to maritime traffic soon afflicted the population with food and fuel rationing. In the first moments, the reaction was one of panic, to the point that proposals were made to transfer the capital to Belo Horizonte.

== Wartime expansion ==
Brazil's advantage was its alliance with an industrial power, the United States. The Americans participated in the defense of Brazilian maritime traffic, provided war materiel through the Lend-Lease Act, and assisted in Brazilian shipbuilding and the adaptation of existing ships to anti-submarine warfare. Crews and garrisons were instructed in new techniques and equipment of American origin. Vargas personally requested ships from the Americans, and Admiral Ingram interceded with his superiors on behalf of Brazil. Starting "from scratch", unprepared and improvising, the Brazilian Navy modernized itself in administrative, professional, and bases and floating assets terms to transform into an anti-submarine force. It was a cycle of naval expansion dictated by international events–the American strategy of hemispheric defense–and not by prior intentions of the Brazilian authorities, who until then were more concerned with regional and internal contexts.

=== Local shipbuilding ===
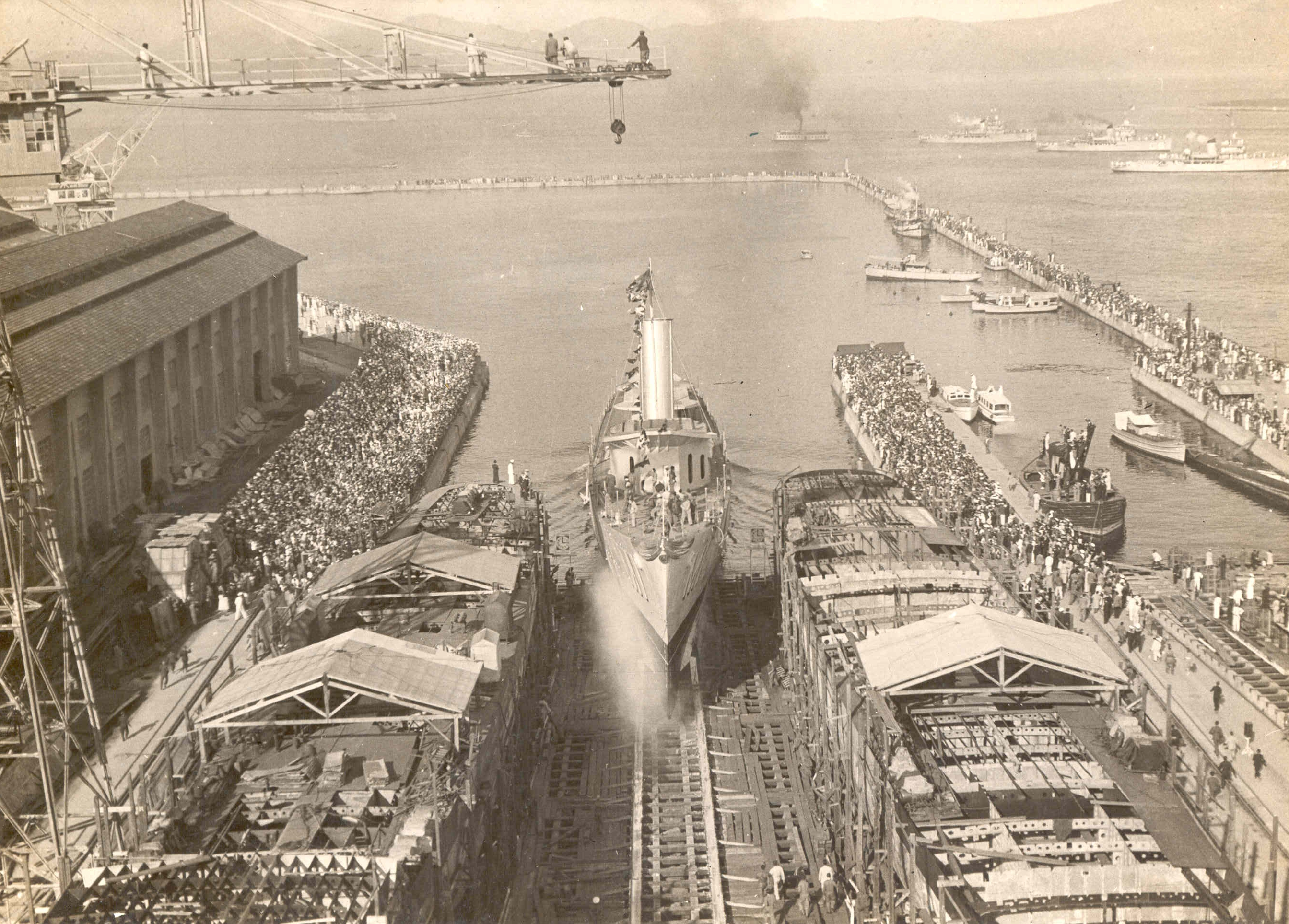
Launch of the destroyer Mariz e Barros at the Navy Arsenal

The ongoing naval program lost access to the European arms market in 1939. The Americans were now the only viable suppliers. The six Javari class destroyers were requisitioned by the Royal Navy, and Brazil received a refund of the amounts paid. Similarly, Italy's entry into the war in 1940 left the submarine order incomplete. The Javari class would have been ideal for the struggle Brazil would face: HMS Hesperus, former Juruena, sank five German submarines. Instead, the Navy Arsenal took advantage of British plans to build the Amazonas class. Construction was slow, and the ships of the class would only be commissioned from 1949 to 1960. In the case of submarines, construction plans in Brazil were abandoned due to lack of priority.

Among the constructions started before the war, the six minelayers of the Carioca class (Carioca, Cananeia, Camocim, Cabedelo, Caravelas and Camaquã) were commissioned between September 1939 and June 1940, the monitor Paraguaçu in 1940 and the three destroyers of the Marcílio Dias class (Marcílio Dias, Mariz e Barros and Greenhalgh) in November 1943. The Laje Shipyard, in Niterói, produced six corvettes (actually trawlers) of the Matias de Albuquerque class. Six submarine chasers of the Piranha class, ordered from the same shipyard, would only be ready after the war. The Americans assisted the Brazilian projects, especially in the first years of the war, when encouraging Allied production freed up American war production for more important areas. By the end of the war, production by the "Arsenal of Democracy" exceeded the needs of the U.S. military, and interest in Brazilian industry waned.

The 1932 naval program resulted in the construction of sixteen major combat ships (corvettes and destroyers), compared to nine frigates, corvettes and submarines built in the period from 1945 to 2005. There was little connection with civilian shipbuilding and the nationalization index was very low: plates and profiles for hulls, machinery, boilers, shafts, propellers, electronic materials and equipment, armaments and even paints were imported. Still, at the end of the war there was limited production of cannons, ammunition, torpedoes and some electronic equipment and increasing independence in smaller ships.

=== Adaptations ===
The existing ships were modernized with the installation of depth charge rails on cruisers, destroyers, monitors, Carioca class minelayers and hydrographic vessels, sonar on cruisers, Carioca class ships and hydrographic vessels, K mortars on Carioca class ships and hydrographic vessels, 120 mm guns on the tanker Marajó and tender Belmonte and 20 mm Oerlikon machine guns on hydrographic vessels, tanker Marajó, monitors and tugboats and other auxiliaries. The hydrographic and minelayers were reclassified as corvettes.

=== Lend-Lease ===
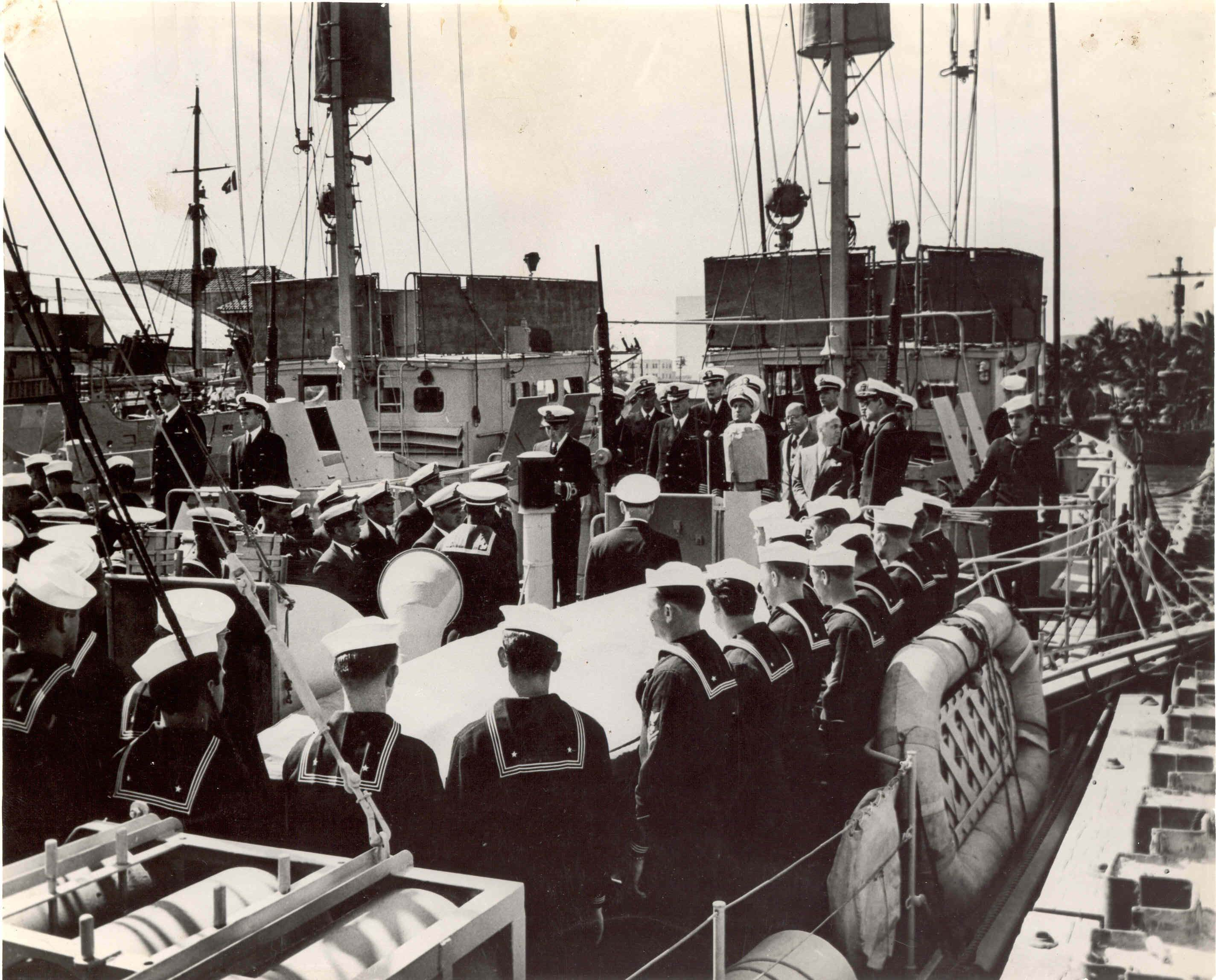
Ceremony marking the transfer of the submarine chasers Jaguarão and Jaguaribe from the United States to Brazil (1943)

It was agreed in October 1941 that Brazil would receive a Lend-Lease credit of 200 million dollars from the U.S., of which fifty million would go to the Navy. Two million dollars were earmarked for arming merchant ships. As resources were provided, the Americans transferred their units to more important theaters of operations, allowing the Brazilians to increase their participation in operations.

Within the program, the U.S. transferred 24 ships of three classes to Brazil throughout the war: eight iron-hulled submarine chasers of the Guaporé class or G class (SC-497 in the U.S.), received between September 1942 and November 1943, eight wooden-hulled submarine chasers of the Javari class or "J" class (PC-461 in the U.S.), between December 1942 and April 1943, and eight escort destroyers of the Bertioga class (Cannon in the US), between August 1944 and May 1945. They were small ships, but modern for anti-submarine warfare. After the war in Europe ended, the transport ship Duque de Caxias would also be transferred in July 1945.

The J class submarine chasers, Javari, Jutaí, Juruá, Juruema, Jaguarão, Jaguaribe, Jacuí and Jundiaí, were mass-produced in the U.S. to relieve larger ships from oceanic operations. 435 units of the SC-497 class were built throughout the war. The "cacinhas" or "caça-paus", as they were nicknamed in Brazil, displaced only 136 tons at full load. They did not exceed the speed or firepower of a surfaced submarine, but they could threaten a submerged submarine with depth charges, K mortars and anti-submarine rocket launchers, the "mousetraps". For detection, they used sonar. The G class submarine chasers, or "iron hunters," Guaporé, Gurupi, Guaíba, Gurupá, Guajará, Goiana, Grajaú, and Graúna, had radar, sonar, and greater armament, displacing 463 tons fully loaded. The escort destroyers Bertioga, Beberibe, Bracuí, Bauru, Baependi, Benevente, Babitonga, and Bocaina, with 1,520 tons fully loaded, were more suitable for engaging submarines, but were only received in the final period of the war.

In 1943, Vargas wrote to U.S. President Franklin D. Roosevelt requesting "half a dozen cruisers of seven to ten thousand tons and ten destroyers similar to the Marcílios," so that the Brazilian Navy could operate further from the coast. The following year, while the Argentine government was in crisis with the U.S., Vargas presented a naval program drawn up by the Navy General Staff, which would include four cruisers, two aircraft carriers, and fifteen destroyers. Roosevelt sympathized with the demands but replied that the resources were needed in the Pacific theater. It was this request that would result in the transfer of the Bertioga class.

Another program, presented in 1945, proposed the acquisition via Lend-Lease of two Nevada class battleships, two Independence class aircraft carriers, four Cleveland class cruisers, 24 destroyers, thirteen submarines, and twelve torpedo boats. The insistence on a powerful surface fleet showed the survival of old naval thinking, focused on rivalry with Argentina, even when there was a clear orientation towards anti-submarine warfare. The American military showed sympathy for the project, interested in the monopoly of supplying war materiel and in standardizing Latin American forces along American lines. However, the American ambassador Adolf A. Berle argued to his superiors that Brazil would be incapable of maintaining such complicated machinery and that the money and effort would be better spent on infrastructure and education. It was the State Department that blocked the proposal, fearing the fostering of a South American military power.

== Port and coastal defense ==
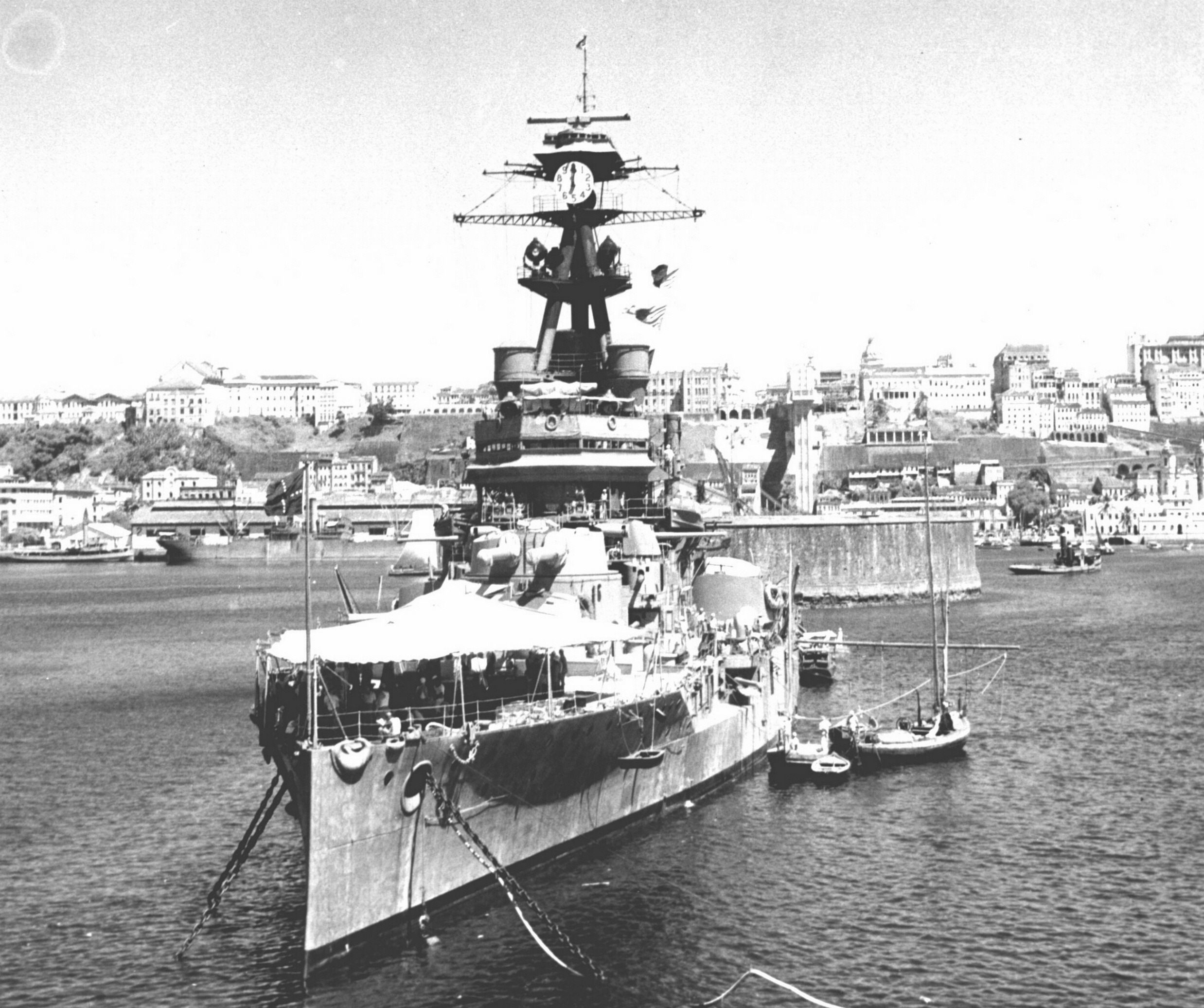
Minas Geraes in the port of Salvador

There were fears of torpedo attacks against ships docked in ports and of hostile landings for acts of sabotage. The three Armed Forces branches were responsible for the defense of the coastline. The Army reinforced the northeastern coast, transferring units from the central-southern part of the country, since 1941. Its coastal artillery, previously present only between Rio de Janeiro and Santos, was extended to all regions of the country, with new groups installed in Belém, Natal, Fernando de Noronha, Recife, Salvador, Imbituba and Rio Grande. The Navy divided the coastline and navigable rivers into Naval Commands, headquartered as follows: North (Belém), Northeast (Recife), East (Salvador), Central (Rio de Janeiro), South (Florianópolis) and Mato Grosso (Ladário). The Naval Commands were directly subordinate to the Navy General Staff and were involved in logistical support and local defense.

Even before the declaration of war, port defense measures were already underway. In Rio de Janeiro, Guanabara Bay was protected by Army fortresses and an anti-torpedo steel network, installed on the Boa Viagem-Villegagnon Island axis and operated by tugboats. Minelayers (Itacurujá, Itajaí and Itapemirim) were organized into the "João das Botas Flotilla" for internal patrolling, while the old Pará class destroyers carried out external patrolling. Piauí, Santa Catarina and Sergipe were decommissioned in July 1944, while Mato Grosso and Rio Grande do Norte served until the end of the war. There is no information on the date of decommissioning of Paraíba, which had been seaworthy since before the war.

The old battleships were moved to Recife (São Paulo) and Salvador (Minas Gerais) as artillery platforms, in cooperation with the Army. Salvador was reinforced in April 1943 by the monitors Parnaíba and Paraguaçu, transferred from the Mato Grosso Naval Command. Armed tugboats patrolled Santos and Rio Grande. In Vitória, the Navy ceded 120 mm naval guns to the Army. Regional Marine Corps Companies were installed in Natal (3rd Company, in 1942), Salvador (4th Company, in 1943) and Recife (5th Company), in 1944. A detachment was installed on Trindade Island. There were discussions about who should garrison Fernando de Noronha, the Navy or the Army, and the National Security Council opted for the Army in 1941. According to Admiral Alberto Lemos Bastos, this occupation "should, I think, have been carried out by the Navy. When I spoke to the minister about this, he told me that the Navy was not in a position to do it".

The coastal fishing colonies were incorporated into the surveillance system, and to that end, the government transferred jurisdiction over the colonies from the Ministry of Agriculture to the Ministry of the Navy in October 1942, where they were subordinated to the Naval Commands and Harbormaster Offices. The promotion of fishing and fish processing industrialization remained the responsibility of the Ministry of Agriculture, which was tasked with organizing cooperative, medical, and educational institutions. The idea was not new: the Navy itself had organized the fishing colonies after the First World War. An illustrative document, issued by the Harbor Master of Paraíba in January 1942, ordered fishermen to show "absolute obedience to everything determined by the overseer of this Harbor Master’s Office […] with regard to information related to coastal surveillance" and to make the "immediate report of any vessel sighted offshore". At the same time, Army infantry and artillery were present among the fishermen. The General Staffs of the two branches took until 1943 to agree on an information-sharing structure.

== Battle of the Atlantic ==
The main maritime opponent, the German submarine force, was perhaps the best of its time, with modern vessels and veteran crews. Against it, the Brazilian Navy's campaign was defensive: the most common task was escorting maritime convoys on the stretch between Trinidad (in the Caribbean) and Rio de Janeiro, and vice versa. There were no ships for offensive maneuvers. Obsolete in naval assets and unable to ensuring security along the Brazilian coast, the force was forced to subordinate itself to the United States Navy. Admiral Jonas H. Ingram assumed command of all Allied forces in the South Atlantic, and American air and naval bases operated from the northeastern salient.

=== Organization ===
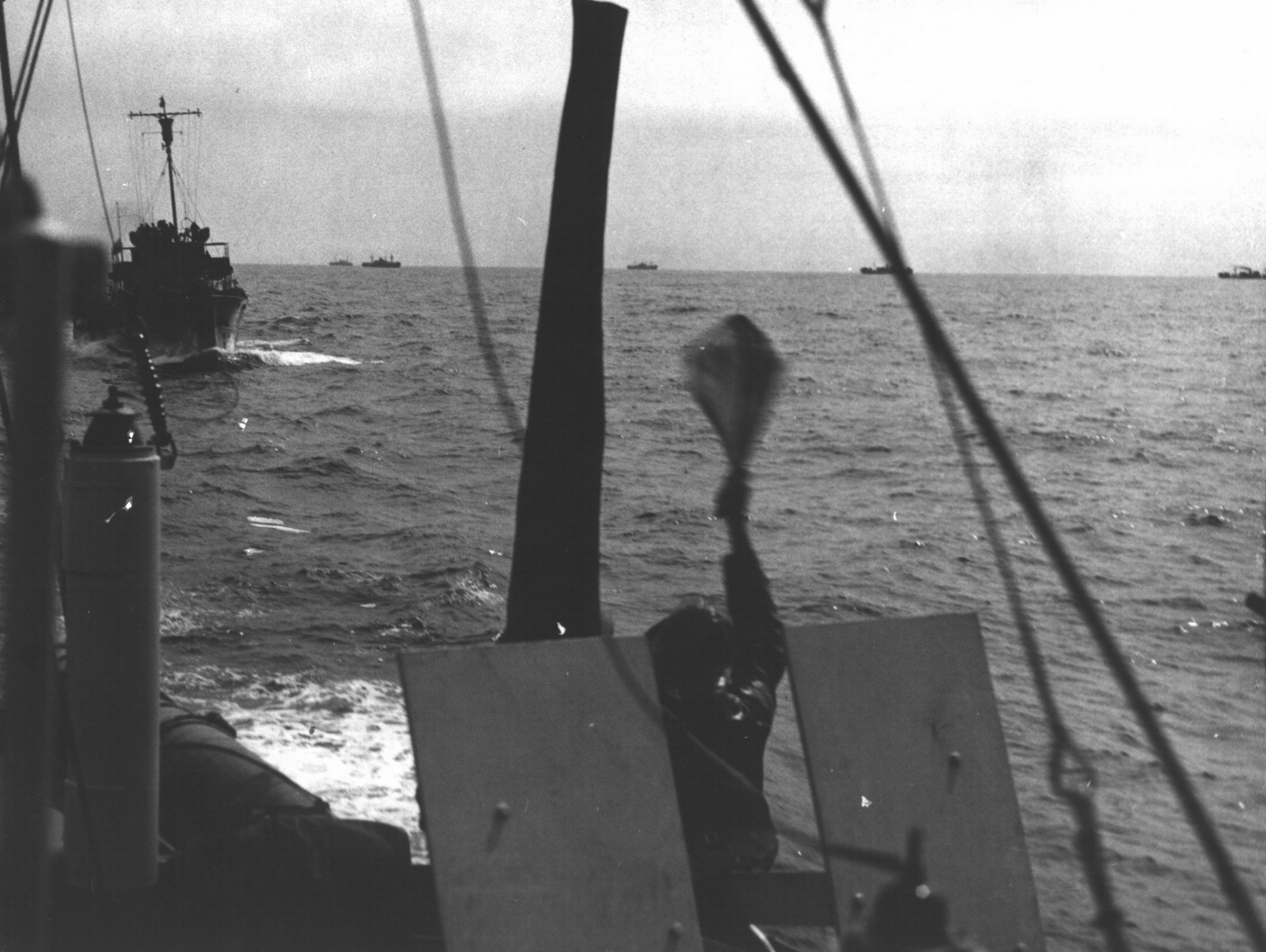
Convoy off the Brazilian coast

The Allied joint command for air–naval operations was called the South Atlantic Force, exercised by Admiral Ingram concurrently with the command of the 4th Fleet, its American component. As such, it was the Americans who formed task groups, assigned missions and designated objectives. On 12 September 1942, the Brazilian naval component was reorganized into the Northeast Naval Force (FNNE), initially under the command of Captain Alfredo Carlos Soares Dutra. Within the structure of the South Atlantic Force, the FNNE would constitute, from May 1943 onward, the FT-46. Elements of the Brazilian Air Force comprised the FT-49. For operations south of Rio de Janeiro, the Southern Patrol Group (GPS) was created on 25 August 1942, and renamed the Southern Naval Force (FNS) on 24 April 1944. Other assets were assigned to the Naval Commands.

The original composition of the FNNE consisted of the cruisers Bahia and Rio Grande do Sul, the minelayers Carioca, Caravelas, Camaquã and Cabedelo, and the submarine chasers Guaporé and Gurupi. Cananeia and Camocim, of the same class, were transferred to the FNNE in 1942 and 1943, respectively. The FNNE would also incorporate the submarines Tamoyo, in 1942, and Tupy, in 1944, the tender Belmonte, in 1942, and the three destroyers of the Marcílio Dias class and the hydrographic vessels Rio Branco and Jaceguai, in 1944. Bahia was one of the ships with the best service record and sailed more between 1942 and 1945 than in its entire career from 1910 to 1942. The tanker Marajó was part of various convoys. The use of submarines was limited to training anti-submarine tactics. The two battleships used for local defense were not part of the FNNE.

The original GPS fleet consisted of the destroyers Santa Catarina, Rio Grande do Norte, and Sergipe. Two months later they were replaced by the destroyer Maranhão and the corvettes Cananeia and Camocim. The submarine Tymbira was included in 1944. The minelayers Caravelas, Camaquã, and Cabedelo were transferred from the FNNE in 1944.

Maritime traffic was organized into convoys, groups of merchant ships escorted by warships. The merchant ships had a common commander, the commodore, and a two-letter identification, the first for the port of departure and the second for the port of arrival, and a sequence number. A TJ convoy, for example, sailed from Trinidad to Rio de Janeiro. The letters were T for Trinidad, R for Recife, B for Salvador, J for Rio de Janeiro, S for Santos, and F for Florianópolis. There were northern convoys, for ships coming from North America and the Caribbean, heading to southern Africa and the Indian Ocean; southern convoys, between Rio de Janeiro and Florianópolis, for ships destined for southern Brazil and Uruguay; special convoys, with exclusively Brazilian escort, and convoys serving the Army and Air Force, on the Recife-Fernando de Noronha route.

=== Operations ===
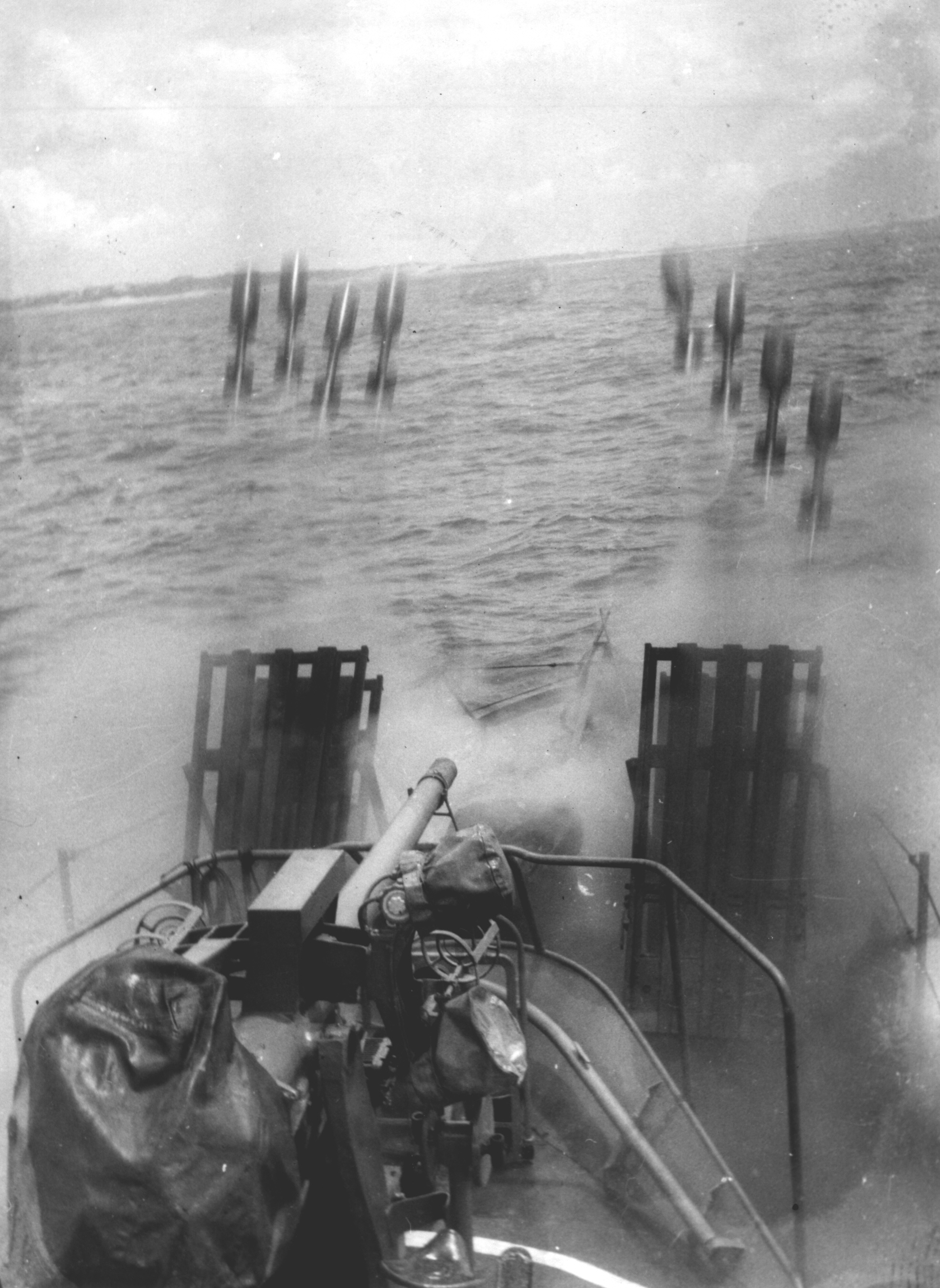
Launching of anti-submarine rockets by the submarine chaser Guajará

Convoys were a necessary evil: it was necessary to wait for the arrival of other merchant ships to form a convoy, and to sail at the speed of the slowest merchant ship. Within convoys, the protected ships adopted formations wider than they were deep. The convoy commander applied safety rules such as daytime communications by searchlights and flags, high-frequency voice communication with visual range, radio silence, and restrictions on smoke and waste disposal. Entry into and exit from ports were preceded by actions such as mine sweeping. In planning, it was very important to select routes, rendezvous areas, and movements at port entrances and exits. Escort ships did not necessarily make the entire journey, and could be replaced by others along the way. Aircraft contributed to escort by patrolling pre-established routes.

The first Rio–Recife convoys were organized in September 1942 and extended the following month to Trinidad, where the Germans sank 375,000 tons of merchant ships between September and November. In that region, escorts were mainly American. From Rio to Recife, they were mostly Brazilian, and from Recife or Salvador to Trinidad, they were mixed. A submarine chaser escorted the fortnightly Fortaleza–Belém or São Luís–Belém trips that brought the "rubber soldiers" to extract this essential product for the Allied war industry. These northern convoys mostly served international routes. Brazilian participation would only begin in February 1943. South of Rio de Janeiro, one of the first missions was to escort coal to the gas factories in São Paulo and Rio.

The peak of the German submarine offensive occurred from June to July 1943, when twelve submarines were operating along the Brazilian coast at the same time. However, the Germans encountered a better-prepared Allied defense. The organization of convoys and anti-submarine patrols reduced the number of Brazilian ships sunk from 24 in 1942 to eight in 1943. The threat was virtually eliminated by the end of the year, so that only one Brazilian ship, Vital de Oliveira, was sunk in 1944.

The wooden submarine chasers did not serve international routes. In the TJ and JT convoys, it was standard practice to change escorts when passing through Salvador. Their endurance was limited, and the long-duration convoys exhausted their crews. The Americans sought to use their submarine chasers only for patrols in the vicinity of ports. In Brazil, the extent of the coastline to be patrolled required long voyages, even if close to shore. According to Admiral Artur Oscar Saldanha da Gama, "the lack of comfort was truly incredible on these small ships, which had good stability but rolled a lot and were swept by waves". "On the longer cruises, Trinidad–Belém or Recife–Belém, the living conditions were truly terrible". Life under such conditions relaxed discipline, just as in the trenches of the Brazilian Expeditionary Force in the Italian campaign. According to then Lieutenant Commander Oswaldo Cortes, the first commander of Jaguarão, "I considered everyone as friends, great friends. We were there suffering the same hardships, the same vicissitudes, everything. Everyone ready to die". According to another commander, Hélio Leôncio Martins, the advantage of leading such a small unit was the freedom of action. On the "iron hunters", the crew enjoyed more comforts, such as bathing.

Since the departure of a convoy escort creates a gap in its defense, only with a reserve of additional warships was it possible to form hunter-killer groups. These consisted of ocean patrols of fast and well-armed ships, on fifteen-day missions to intercept submarines, raiders, and blockade runners in predetermined areas of the Atlantic between Brazil and Africa. Only after the incorporation of the first Marcílio Dias class destroyer class into the FNNE, in 1944, did Brazil begin to participate in ocean patrols. The Navy was also responsible for escorting the transport of the FEB transport to Gibraltar. After the end of the war in Europe, when troops and materiel were transferred to the Pacific theater, Brazilian ships participated in the rescue and guidance service for American aircraft between the Brazilian and African coasts. With the end of the war, the FNNE returned to Rio de Janeiro on 7 November 1945, and was disbanded.

=== Results ===
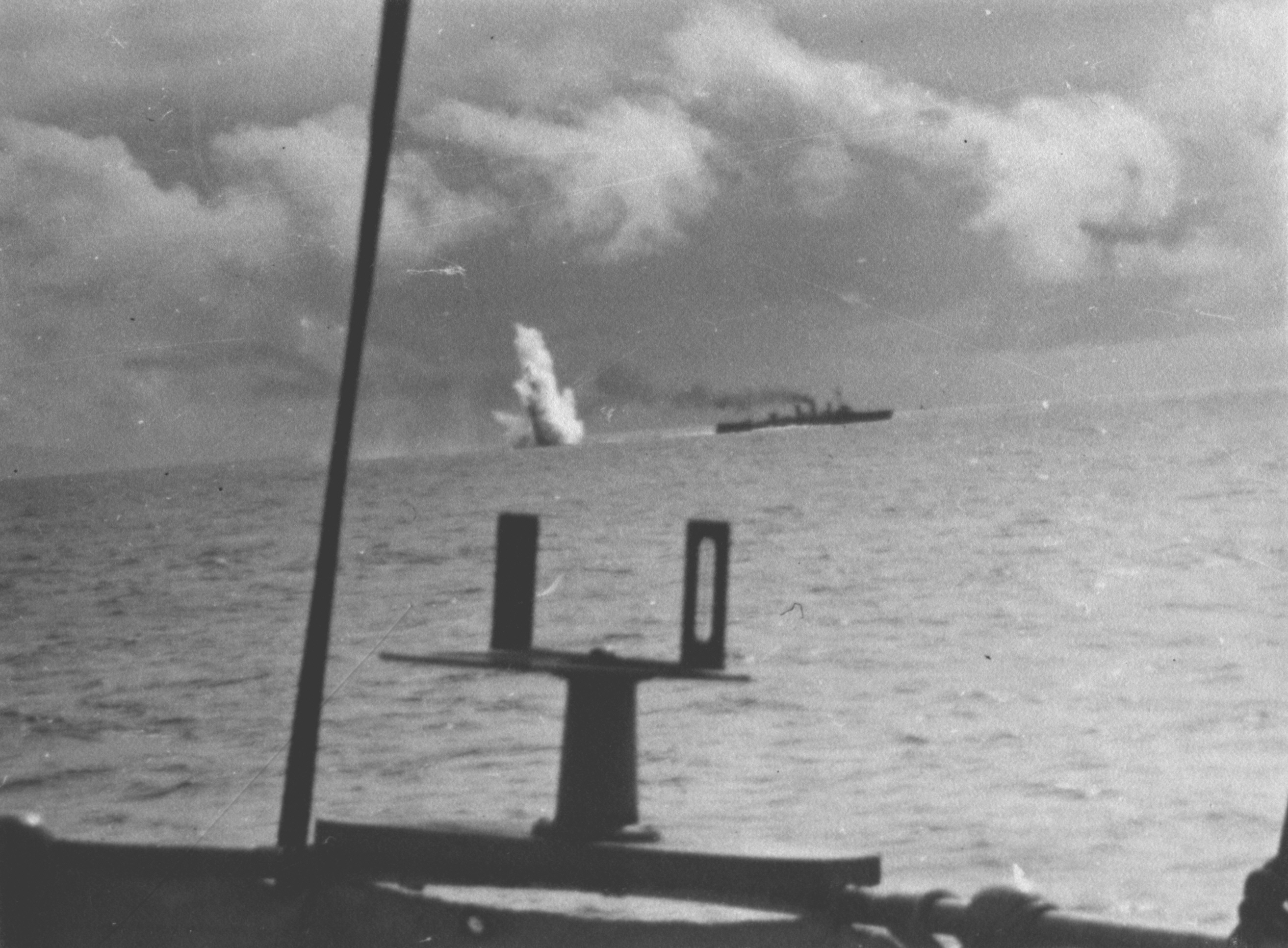
Depth charge launch by the cruiser Bahia, seen from the corvette Carioca

Between 1942 and 1945, approximately 3,164 ships were escorted in 575 convoys, of which 1,577 were Brazilian and 1,041 were American, with 99.01% of the protected ships reaching their destinations. In the escorted convoys, the only losses were of ships that straggled or were forced to leave the convoy because of engine smoke. More than a thousand Brazilians died in the Battle of the Atlantic in 33 sinkings. Two small torpedoed ships were not identified, but because they were sunk off the Brazilian coast, it was concluded that they were Brazilian ships, probably sailing vessels. In gross tonnage, 21.47% of the national fleet was lost.

The Brazilian Navy's losses comprised the auxiliary ship Vital de Oliveira, sunk by a German submarine on the Vitória–Rio route on 19 July 1944; the corvette Camaquã, capsized by heavy seas on 21 July 1944, twelve miles off the Recife bar entrance, while returning from escorting convoy JT-18; and the cruiser Bahia, which sank itself after the accidental detonation of one of its depth charges during a firing exercise on 4 July 1945. The Navy suffered 463 deaths on the three ships lost. Another 23 servicemen died aboard other ships, for a total of 486 deaths.

The escort vessels covered a total of 600,000 nautical miles, not counting the maneuvers (zigzagging) performed to hinder submarine detection and evade enemy torpedoes, equivalent to 28 laps around the globe along the equator. The Brazilian Navy convoyed the equivalent of fifty merchant ships for each Brazilian warship. In comparison, the United States Navy convoyed sixteen merchant ships for each warship. The warship that spent the most time at sea was the submarine chaser Guaporé, totaling 427 days at sea in just over three years of operation, with an annual average of 142 days at sea. The ship that participated in the largest number of convoys was the corvette Caravelas, with 77 participations.

66 attacks were carried out against German submarines, according to German Navy documentation. Ten German submarines and one Italian submarine were sunk off the Brazilian coast during the war, none of them by the Brazilian Navy. The true submarine killers were aircraft, which participated in all eleven kills. Even the American fleet only directly hit one, U-128, in May 1943. Throughout the war, of the 805 submarines lost by Germany, 382 were destroyed by aircraft, 252 by ships, and 51 by combined actions. Brazil received the more powerful escort destroyers, better suited to anti-submarine warfare, and acquired the means to form hunter-killer groups only at the end of the war, when the sea was already relatively safe.

In the case of Brazilian submarine hunters, several sonar contacts and depth charge attacks were recorded. It is possible, though difficult to prove, that some of the attacks caused damage, as in the case of U-590, attacked by Jacuí and Jundiaí in July 1943. Even among U.S. Navy submarine chasers, only one confirmed sinking of an Axis submarine occurred, according to Samuel Eliot Morison's official naval history. Destroying submarines was not essential to the role of this type of ship, which already had an effect by scaring them off from attacking the escorted ships. According to the official historical account of 1985, each successful convoy crossing "was a victory, albeit indirect, which was repeated hundreds of times during the war", in a campaign "without great heroic feats or the motivation of immediate results", which required "continuity, permanence at sea, daily sacrifices".

== Legacy ==
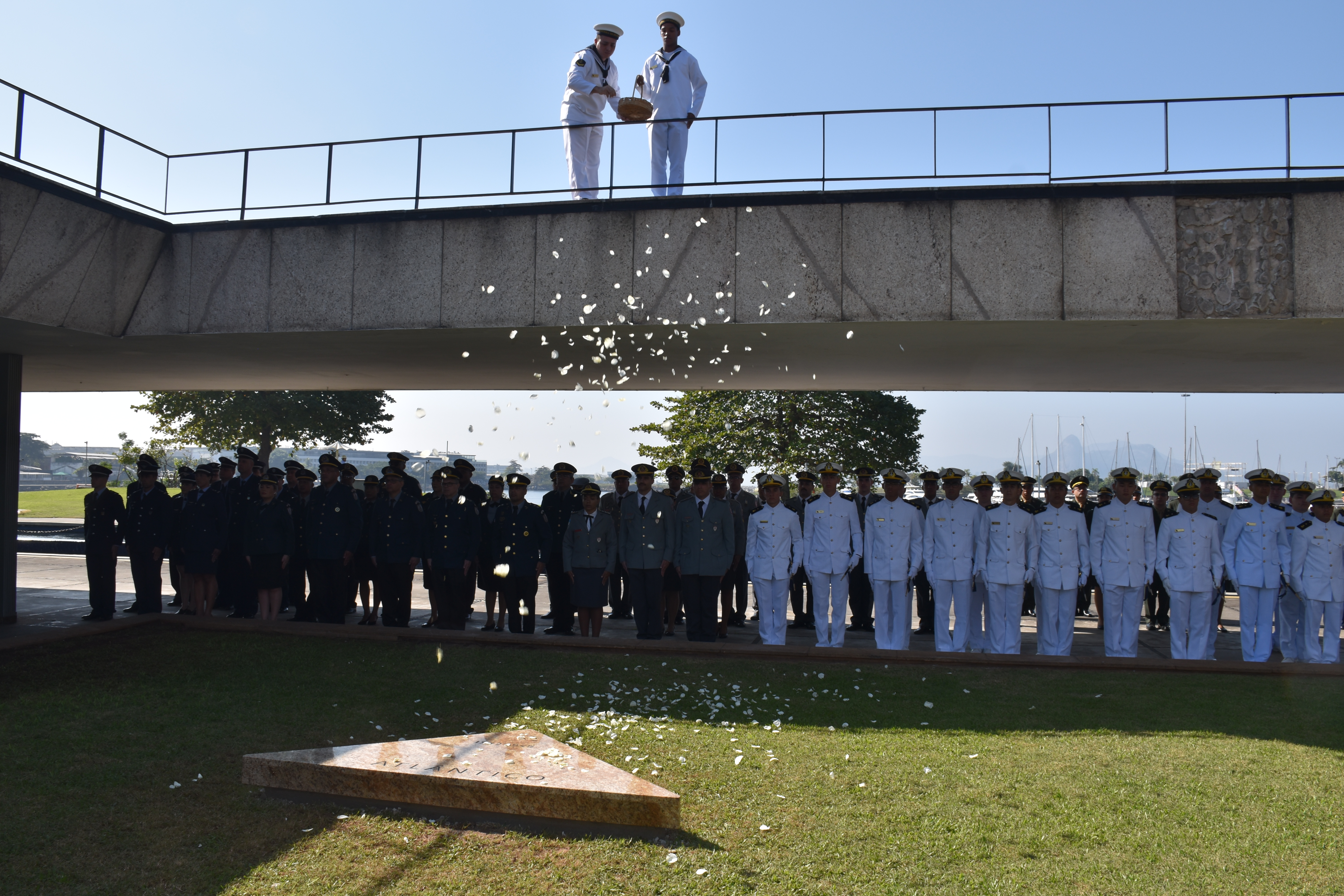
Ceremony in memory of naval war dead of the Second World War in 2024

At the end of the conflict, Brazil was the leading South American military power, albeit only in anti-submarine warfare and only at the tactical level. This marked the culmination of one of the roughly four-decade cycles of moderate fleet expansion followed by contraction, seen after 1910 and before 1980. The transfer of ships from the Lend-Lease program was made permanent. The U.S. did not compensate Brazil for its use of facilities on Brazilian territory, but left the improvements made and materiel in warehouses in Brazilian possession.

In the postwar period, Brazil entered a collective defense system of the Western Hemisphere, under American leadership, with the Soviet Union as its tacit enemy in the context of the Cold War. In Brazilian naval thinking, Soviet submarines replaced German ones. In an eventual operation, the Brazilian Navy would assist the United States Navy in anti-submarine operations against the soviets.

Large stocks of used ships, surplus to the needs of their countries of origin and costly to maintain, remained available. For the Brazilian Navy, American influence, consolidated by Lend-Lease, continued through the Brazil-United States Military Agreement, through which it had access to surplus United States Navy vessels at low prices. Several classes of destroyers of American origin would form the backbone of the fleet for the next three decades, retiring the old battleships. The Navy entered the era of radar and sonar. Instead of large ships, there were small and agile units, which replaced reciprocating engines with diesel propulsion and large long-range guns with light dual-purpose guns, surface torpedoes and anti-submarine weapons.

The ease provided by the Military Agreement led to neglect of domestic naval industry, which failed to sustain the scale of production achieved during the war. Obsolete American materiel continued to fill the naval inventory until the 1967 program, when the Navy placed orders for modern ships built in Europe or Brazil. In 1977, the Ernesto Geisel administration broke with the Military Agreement and dismissed the American Naval Mission. The new naval thinking ceased to prioritize anti-submarine warfare.

It is a common opinion that the Army's combat in the Brazilian Expeditionary Force was a more "real" participation than the Navy's convoy escorts. Naval historical discourse challenges this view and attempts to affirm the relevance of the maritime campaign. The 1985 edition of the Brazilian Naval History also draws a political meaning from the events, blaming the "lack of vision of our public men" for the country's unpreparedness for an emergency. The date of remembrance for the Navy dead in war is 21 July, the day of the sinking of the corvette Camaquã, established by a notice from the Ministry of the Navy in 1969. Annual ceremonies are held at Flamengo Park, where the National Monument to the Dead of the Second World War is located. The destroyer Bauru was preserved as a museum ship dedicated to the Second World War.
