= 1928 Dornier J Santos Dumont crash =

Brazilian plane crash

Coordinates: 22°47′S 43°9′W

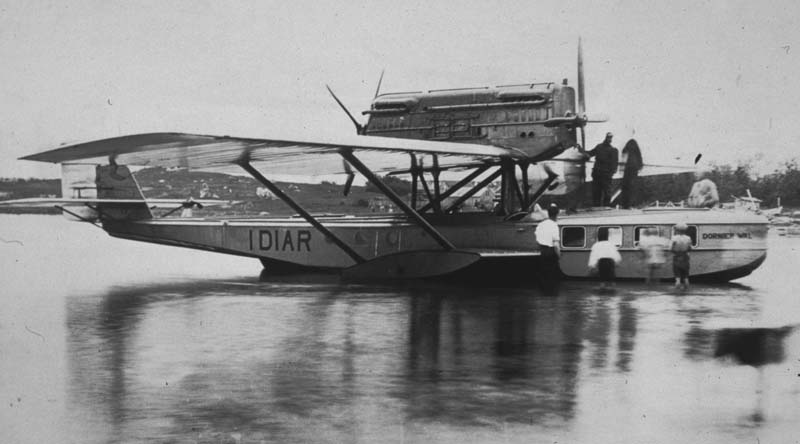
- A Dornier Do J

Accident
- Date: December 3, 1928; 97 years ago
- Summary: Mid-air collision
- Site: Guanabara Bay, Rio de Janeiro,
- Total fatalities: 14
- Total injuries: 0
- Total survivors: 0

First aircraft
- Type: Dornier Do J
- Operator: Syndicato Condor
- Registration: P-BACA (Santos Dumont)
- Flight origin: Rio de Janeiro
- Destination: Rio de Janeiro
- Occupants: 14
- Passengers: 9
- Crew: 5
- Fatalities: 14
- Survivors: 0

Second aircraft
- Type: Dornier Do J
- Operator: Syndicato Condor
- Registration: P-BAIA (Guanabara)
- Flight origin: Rio de Janeiro
- Occupants: 5
- Crew: 5
- Fatalities: 0
- Survivors: 5

On 3 December 1928, a Dornier Do J seaplane named after the Brazilian aviation pioneer Alberto Santos Dumont crashed into Guanabara Bay, Brazil, during the celebrations for the return of the aviator to his homeland.

On that occasion, several honours were organized, including the over-flight of the SS Cap Arcona ship by two Do Js flying boats of the Condor Syndicate.

== Accident ==
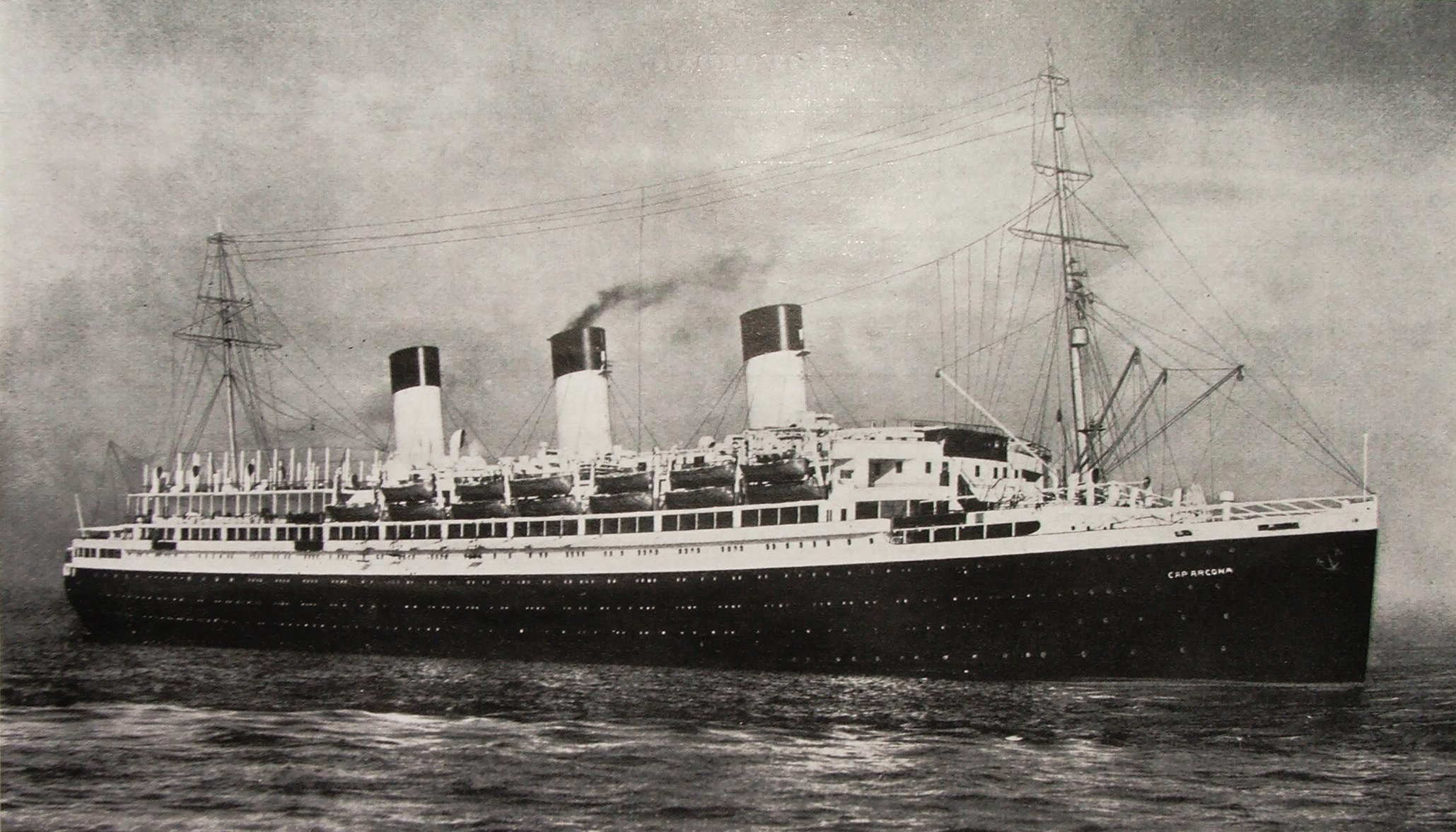
The SS Cap Arcona in 1927.

The Dornier Do Js, P-BAIA Guanabara and P-BACA Santos Dumont, took off from Guanabara Bay and flew over the Cap Arcona, where they sent welcome messages to Alberto Santos Dumont. The Santos Dumont was flown by August Wilhem Paschen and was carrying nine passengers and crew, including friends of Santos Dumont and personalities of the time.

Due to the error of one of the pilots, the two aircraft entered a collision course, forcing the pilots to perform evasive maneuvers. The Guanabara escaped unscathed from the near collision, but the Santos Dumont crashed into Guanabara Bay, watched by the crew and passengers of the Arcona, including Santos Dumont. Depressed, he suspended the festivities and returned to Paris. Despite rescue efforts led by the Brazilian Navy destroyers Amazonas and Pará, only the mechanic of the aircraft, Walter Hasseldorf, survived the crash, dying hours later.

During the removal of the bodies and the remains of the aircraft, a Brazilian Navy diver died.

== Consequences ==
After witnessing the accident, Santos Dumont became depressed, canceling the festivities and returning to France. His depression worsened and he ultimately committed suicide in 1932. This was the first accident with a commercial aircraft in Brazil, although it was not operating commercially that day, generating great commotion with the press and public opinion.

== Bibliography ==
- SILVA, Carlos Ari Cesar Germano da; O rastro da bruxa: história da aviação comercial brasileira no século XX através dos seus acidentes; Porto Alegre Editora EDIPUCRS, 2008, pp 18–21.
