= Brazilian ship Amazonas =

At least four ships of the Brazilian Navy have borne the name Amazonas

- Brazilian destroyer Amazonas (1908), a Pará-class destroyer launched in 1908 and stricken in 1931
- Brazilian destroyer Amazonas (1943), an Acre-class destroyer launched in 1943 and stricken in 1973
- Brazilian submarine Amazonas, a Balao-class submarine acquired in 1973 and scrapped in 2001
- Brazilian corvette Amazonas, an Amazonas-class corvette launched in 2009 as Port of Spain for the Trinidad and Tobago Coastguard she was acquired by Brazil in 2012
