= Brazilian ship Alagoas =

At least three ships of the Brazilian Navy have borne the name Alagoas

- Brazilian monitor Alagoas, a Pará-class monitor launched in 1867 and scrapped in 1900
- Brazilian destroyer Alagoas (1909), a Pará-class destroyer launched in 1909 and stricken in 1939
- Brazilian destroyer Alagoas (1973), a Mato Grosso-class destroyer formerly USS Buck acquired in 1973 and stricken in 1995
