= Brazilian destroyer Paraná =

Brazilian destroyer Paraná may refer to:

- Brazilian destroyer Paraná (1910), a Pará-class destroyer for the Brazilian Navy
- Brazilian destroyer Paraná (1961) (pennant number D29), a Pará-class destroyer for the Brazilian Navy; the former American Fletcher-class destroyer USS Cushing (DD-797); acquired by Brazil in 1961; scrapped in 1982
- Brazilian destroyer Paraná (1989) (pennant number D29), the former American Garcia-class frigate USS Sample (FF-1048); acquired by the Brazilian Navy in 1989 and classed as a destroyer; decommissioned in 2004; sunk en route to scrappers in India in 2005
