= Brazilian destroyer Rio Grande do Norte =

At least two ships of the Brazilian Navy have borne the name Rio Grande do Norte

- Brazilian destroyer Rio Grande do Norte (1909), a Pará-class destroyer launched in 1909 and stricken in 1944
- Brazilian destroyer Rio Grande do Norte (D37) an Allen M. Sumner-class destroyer launched in 1944 as USS Strong, acquired by Brazil in 1973 and foundered en route to be scrapped in 1997
