= Brazilian ship Santa Catarina =

At least three ships of the Brazilian Navy have borne the name Santa Catharina or Santa Catarina

- Brazilian monitor Santa Catharina, a Pará-class monitor launched in 1868 and sunk in 1882
- Brazilian destroyer Santa Catarina (1909), a Pará-class destroyer launched in 1909 and stricken in 1944
- Brazilian destroyer Santa Catarina (D32) a Fletcher-class destroyer launched in 1943 as USS Irwin, acquired by Brazil in 1968 and expended as a target in 1990
