= Brazilian destroyer Sergipe =

At least two ships of the Brazilian Navy have borne the name Sergipe:

- Brazilian destroyer Sergipe (1910), a Pará-class destroyer launched in 1910 and stricken in 1944
- Brazilian destroyer Sergipe (D35) an Allen M. Sumner-class destroyer launched in 1944 as USS James C. Owen, acquired by Brazil in 1973 and stricken in 1995
