= Brazilian destroyer Paraíba =

Brazilian destroyer Paraíba may refer to:

- Brazilian destroyer Paraíba (1909), a Pará-class destroyer
- Brazilian destroyer Paraíba (1959) (pennant number D28), a Pará-class destroyer for the Brazilian Navy; the former American Fletcher class USS Bennett (DD-473); acquired by the Brazilian Navy in 1959; scrapped in 1978
- Brazilian destroyer Paraíba (1989) (pennant number D28), the former American Garcia-class frigate USS Davidson (FF-1045); acquired by the Brazilian Navy in 1989 and classed as a destroyer; decommissioned in 2001; sunk en route to scrappers in India in 2005
