= Brazilian destroyer Mato Grosso =

At least two ships of the Brazilian Navy have borne the name Mato Grosso

- Brazilian destroyer Mato Grosso (1908), a Pará-class destroyer launched in 1908 and stricken in 1946
- Brazilian destroyer Mato Grosso (D34) an Allen M. Sumner-class destroyer launched in 1944 as USS Compton, acquired by Brazil in 1972 and stricken in 1990
