= Brazilian ship Tamoio =

Tamoio or Tamoyo is the name of the following ships of the Brazilian Navy, named for the Tamoio people:

- Brazilian cruiser Tamoio, a torpedo cruiser launched in 1895 and decommissioned in 1915
- Brazilian submarine Tamoyo (1937) (S13), an Adua-class submarine acquired from Italy as a Tupy or T-class submarine; operated in World War II.
- Brazilian submarine Tamoio (S31), a Tupi-class submarine launched in 1993 and decommissioned in 2023

== See also ==
- Bernardini MB-3 Tamoyo, a Brazilian battle tank
