= Brazilian cruiser Tamoio =

Torpedo cruiser

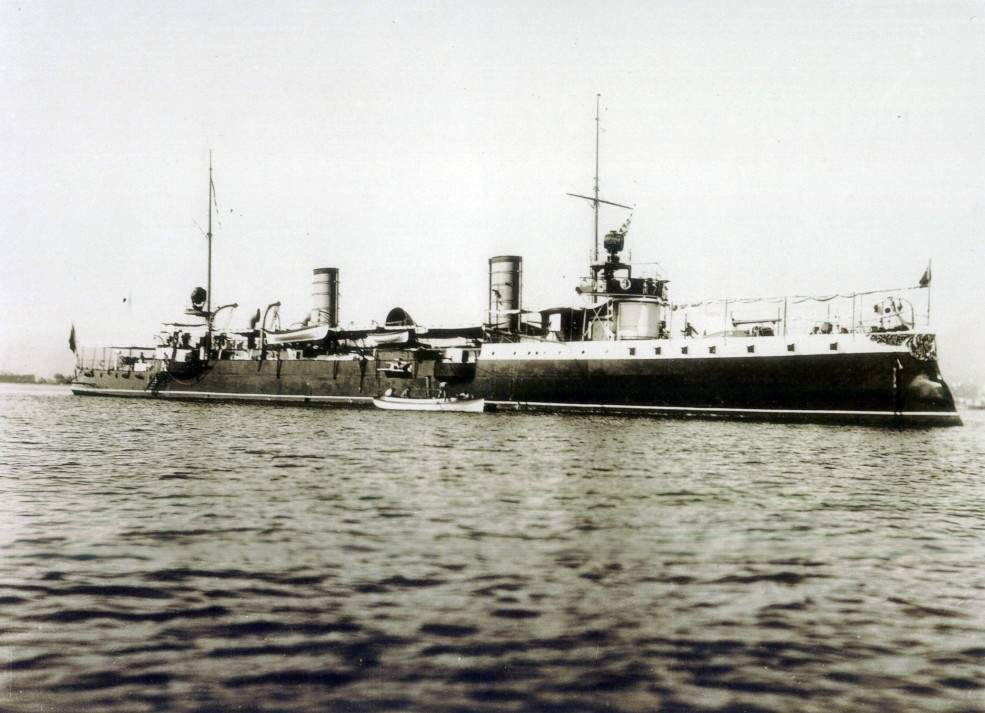
- Tamoio before 1900

History

Brazil
- Name: Tamoio
- Namesake: Tamoio people
- Owner: Brazilian Navy
- Builder: AG Vulcan Stettin
- Launched: 1895
- Commissioned: November 1896
- Decommissioned: 1916
- Fate: Scrapped

General characteristics
- Class & type: Tupi-class torpedo cruiser
- Displacement: 1,080 tonnes (1,060 long tons; 1,190 short tons)
- Length: 86.04 m (282 ft 3 in)
- Beam: 8.40 m (28 ft)
- Draft: 3.8 m (12 ft 6 in)
- Installed power: 7,500 ihp (5,600 kW)
- Propulsion: 2 × triple-expansion steam engines; 2 × screw propellers
- Speed: 22 knots (41 km/h; 25 mph)
- Complement: 155
- Armament: 2 × 101mm Armstrong guns; 6 × 57mm Maxim Nordenfelt guns; 2 × 37mm Maxim Nordenfelt guns; 2 × 7mm Maxim Nordenfelt machine guns; 2 × 452 mm (17.8 in) torpedo tubes

Tamoio was a torpedo cruiser operated by the Brazilian Navy, belonging to the Tupi class along with Tupi and Tymbira. The vessel was one of three from the so-called "White Division", on a mission to transport Brazilian president Campos Sales to Argentina in 1900. The ship was decommissioned in 1916.

== Construction and design ==
Tamoio was built by the Stettin shipyard, in Kiel, Germany, and was launched in 1895. Its name is a tribute to the Tamoio, a Brazilian indigenous tribe that dominated the regions of Cabo Frio and Ubatuba in the 16th century, and who left the Portuguese who lived there in constant alarm. The ship was the last of its class to be delivered. Its commissioning took place in November 1896. It displaced 1,080 tons, measured 86.04 m in length, 8.40 m in beam, 5.58 m in depth and 3.80 m in draft. Its propulsion system consisted of two triple expansion steam reciprocating engines that generated 7,500 HP of power and propelled the vessel at up to 22 knots of speed. It had two 101 mm Armstrong guns, six 57 mm Nordenfelt guns, two 37 mm Maxim guns, two 25 mm Maxim machine guns and two 452mm torpedo tubes. Its crew consisted of 155 officers and enlisted men.

== Service ==
Among the ship's first assignments was a visit to Argentina, being incorporated into the "White Division" that took president Campos Sales in return for the same gesture by Argentine president Julio Argentino Roca. In 1907, it was one of the Brazilian ships that appeared in the naval magazine International of Hampton Roads, in the United States, accompanying the battleship Riachuelo and the cruiser Almirante Barroso, in a Task Group under the command of admiral Duarte Huet de Bacelar Pinto Guedes. Throughout 1913, Tamoio participated in several commissions, divisions and naval exercises with other vessels of the Brazilian Navy. The last record of its activities was in 1916, a commission to the ports of northern Brazil. It went through the disarmament display soon after.

== See also ==
- List of historical ships of the Brazilian Navy
