= Brazilian destroyer Paraíba (1909) =

History

Brazil
- Name: Paraíba
- Namesake: Paraíba (Brazilian state)
- Ordered: 1904
- Builder: Yarrow, Scotstoun
- Yard number: 1265
- Launched: 18 May 1909
- Completed: 1909
- Decommissioned: 1944
- Identification: 5
- Fate: Scrapped

General characteristics
- Type: Pará-class destroyer
- Displacement: 560 long tons (570 t)
- Length: 240 ft (73 m)
- Beam: 23 ft 6 in (7.16 m)
- Draught: 7 ft 10 in (2.39 m)
- Installed power: 6,700 ihp (5,000 kW); 2 double-ended Yarrow boilers
- Propulsion: 2 shafts, 2 vertical triple expansion steam engines
- Speed: 27 knots (31 mph; 50 km/h)
- Range: 3,700 nautical miles (6,900 km) at 14 knots (16 mph; 26 km/h)
- Complement: 130
- Armament: 2 × 4 in (102 mm) guns; 4 × 47 mm (3pdr) guns, mounting P Mark I, 2 × single torpedo tubes for 18 in (460 mm) torpedoes

Paraíba was a Pará-class destroyer of the Brazilian Navy, serving from 1909 to 1944. She was named after the Brazilian state of Paraíba.

== Description and Construction ==
Line drawing of the Pará class

The ship had an overall length of 240 feet (73.2 m), a beam of 23.5 feet (7.2 m) and a draught of 7 5/6 feet (2.4 m). She was powered by 2 triple expansion reciprocating steam engines, driving two shafts, which developed a total of 6,700 indicated horsepower (5,000 kW) and gave a maximum design speed of 27 knots (50 km/h; 31 mph). During the trials the contract speed was exceeded, and the vessel was clocked at 27.29 knots (50.54 km/h; 31.40 mph). Steam for the turbines was provided by two double-ended Yarrow boilers. Paraíba carried a maximum of 140 long tons (140 t) of coal that gave her a range of approximately 3,700 nautical miles (6,900 km; 4,300 mi) at 14 knots (26 km/h; 16 mph).

The ship mounted two 4 in (102 mm) guns in single mounts. In addition, four 47 mm (3pdr) cannons in single mounts were deployed at the time of launching.

Her first commander was Captain Affonso de Fonseca Rodrigues.

== Bibliography ==
- Scheina, Robert L. (1985). "Brazil". In Gray, Randal (ed.). Conway's All the World's Fighting Ships 1906–1921. Naval Institute Press. pp. 403–407. ISBN 0-87021-907-3. OCLC 12119866.
- "CT Parahyba - CT 5." Navios De Guerra Brasileiros. Accessed 27 August 2017.
- "Paraíba IV." Serviço de Documentação da Marinha — Histórico de Navios. Diretoria do Patrimônio Histórico e Documentação da Marinha, Departamento de História Marítima. Accessed 27 August 2017.
