= Brazilian destroyer Alagoas (1909) =

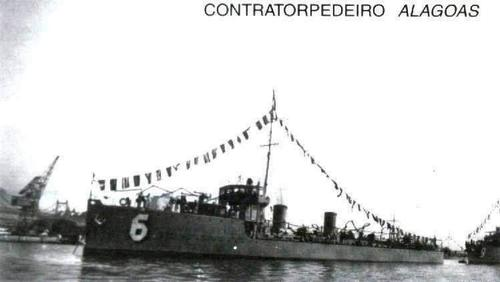

History

Brazil
- Name: Alagoas
- Namesake: Alagoas (Brazilian state)
- Ordered: 1904
- Builder: Yarrow, Scotstoun
- Yard number: 1266
- Launched: 29 July 1909
- Completed: 1909
- Decommissioned: 1939
- Identification: 6
- Fate: Scrapped

General characteristics
- Type: Pará-class destroyer
- Displacement: 560 long tons (570 t)
- Length: 240 ft (73 m)
- Beam: 23 ft 6 in (7.16 m)
- Draught: 7 ft 10 in (2.39 m)
- Installed power: 7,403 ihp (5,520 kW); 2 double-ended Yarrow boilers
- Propulsion: 2 shafts, 2 vertical triple expansion steam engines
- Speed: 27 knots (31 mph; 50 km/h)
- Range: 3,700 nautical miles (6,900 km) at 14 knots (16 mph; 26 km/h)
- Complement: 130
- Armament: 2 × 4 in (102 mm) guns; 4 × 47 mm (3pdr) guns, mounting P Mark I, 2 × single torpedo tubes for 18 in (460 mm) torpedoes

Alagoas was a Pará-class destroyer of the Brazilian Navy, serving from 1909 to 1939. She was named after the Brazilian state of Alagoas.

== Description and Construction ==
Line drawing of the Pará class

The ship had an overall length of 240 feet (73.2 m), a beam of 23.5 feet (7.2 m) and a draught of 7 5/6 feet (2.4 m). She was powered by 2 triple expansion reciprocating steam engines, driving two shafts, which developed a total of 7,403 indicated horsepower (5,520 kW) and gave a maximum design speed of 27 knots (50 km/h; 31 mph). During the trials the contract speed was exceeded, and the vessel was clocked at 27.25 knots (50.47 km/h; 31.36 mph). Steam for the turbines was provided by two double-ended Yarrow boilers. Alagoas carried a maximum of 140 long tons (140 t) of coal that gave her a range of approximately 3,700 nautical miles (6,900 km; 4,300 mi) at 14 knots (26 km/h; 16 mph).

The ship mounted two 4 in (102 mm) guns in single mounts. In addition, four 47 mm (3pdr) cannons in single mounts were deployed at the time of launching.

The official full speed trial for Alagoas took place on November 26, 1909 on the Skelmorlie deep-water measured mile at the mouth of the Clyde. During a continuous three hour run with a 100 ton load, the ship exceeded her contract speed of 27 knots.

== Bibliography ==
- "Alagoas (3º)." Serviço de Documentação da Marinha — Histórico de Navios. Diretoria do Patrimônio Histórico e Documentação da Marinha, Departamento de História Marítima. Accessed 27 August 2017.
- Scheina, Robert L. (1985). "Brazil". In Gray, Randal (ed.). Conway's All the World's Fighting Ships 1906–1921. Naval Institute Press. pp. 403–407. ISBN 0-87021-907-3. OCLC 12119866.
- "CT Alagoas - CT 6." Navios De Guerra Brasileiros. Accessed 27 August 2017.
