= Brazilian destroyer Pará (1908) =

History

Brazil
- Name: Pará
- Namesake: Pará (Brazilian state)
- Ordered: June 1907
- Builder: Yarrow, Scotstoun
- Yard number: 1260
- Launched: 14 July 1908
- Completed: 1908
- Commissioned: 31 December 1909
- Decommissioned: 1933
- Identification: 2
- Fate: Scrapped

General characteristics
- Type: Pará-class destroyer
- Displacement: 560 long tons (570 t) (standard); 650 long tons (660 t) (deep load)
- Length: 240 ft (73 m)
- Beam: 23 ft 6 in (7.16 m)
- Draught: 7 ft 10 in (2.39 m)
- Installed power: 7,014 ihp (5,230 kW); 2 double-ended Yarrow boilers
- Propulsion: 2 shafts; 2 × 4-cylinder vertical triple expansion
- Speed: 27 knots (31 mph; 50 km/h)
- Range: 3,700 nautical miles (6,900 km) at 14 knots (16 mph; 26 km/h)
- Complement: 75 officers and men (peacetime); 130 wartime
- Armament: 2 × 4 in (102 mm) guns; 4 × 47 mm (3pdr) guns, mounting P Mark I, 2 × single torpedo tubes for 18 in (460 mm) torpedoes

Pará was the lead ship of Pará-class destroyers of the Brazilian Navy, serving from 1909 to 1936. She was named after the Brazilian state of Pará.

== Description and Construction ==
Line drawing of the Pará class

In 1904 Brazil adopted an ambitious plan to renovate and modernize its Navy. The Naval Renovation Program was negotiated and enacted in December 1904 and envisioned acquisition of large number of vessels, including a dozen destroyers. In 1906 the program was modified reducing the total number of destroyers to ten. These ships became known as Pará-class destroyers.

The ship had an overall length of 240 feet (73.2 m), a beam of 23.5 feet (7.2 m) and a draught of 7 5/6 feet (2.4 m). She was powered by 2 triple expansion reciprocating steam engines, driving two shafts, which developed a total of 7,014 indicated horsepower (5,230 kW) and gave a maximum design speed of 27 knots (50 km/h; 31 mph). During the trials the contract speed was exceeded, and the vessel was clocked at 27.25 knots (50.47 km/h; 31.36 mph). Steam for the turbines was provided by two double-ended Yarrow boilers. During the trials Pará ran 26.337 nautical miles (48.776 km; 30.308 mi) to the ton of coal. The vessel carried a maximum of 140 long tons (140 t) of coal that gave her a range of about 3,692 nautical miles (6,838 km; 4,249 mi) at 14 knots (26 km/h; 16 mph).

The ship mounted two 4 in (102 mm) guns in single mounts. In addition, four 47 mm (3pdr) cannons in single mounts were deployed at the time of launching.

The official full speed trial for Pará took place on September 16, 1908 in the Firth of the Clyde. During a continuous three hour run with a 100 ton load, the ship exceeded her contract speed of 27 knots.

Her first commander was Captain Felinto Perry.

=== Incidents during construction ===
On November 19, 1908, while leaving the Yarrow yard for Greenock Pará collided with a hopper barge. The destroyer sustained only minor damage and proceeded to her destination.

== Bibliography ==
- Gardiner, Robert and Randal Gray, eds. Conway's All the World's Fighting Ships 1906–1921. Annapolis: Naval Institute Press, 1985. ISBN 0-87021-907-3. OCLC 12119866.
- "CT Pará - CT 2." Navios De Guerra Brasileiros. Accessed 27 August 2017.
- "Pará IV." Serviço de Documentação da Marinha — Histórico de Navios. Diretoria do Patrimônio Histórico e Documentação da Marinha, Departamento de História Marítima. Accessed 19 August 2017.
