= Brazilian destroyer Mato Grosso (1908) =

Brazilian Pará-class destroyer

- Mato Grosso steaming at high speed shortly after her completion

History

Brazil
- Name: Mato Grosso
- Namesake: Mato Grosso (Brazilian state)
- Ordered: June 1907
- Builder: Yarrow, Scotstoun
- Yard number: 1263
- Launched: 23 December 1908
- Completed: 5 May 1909
- Decommissioned: 1946
- Identification: 10
- Fate: Scrapped

General characteristics
- Type: Pará-class destroyer
- Displacement: 560 long tons (570 t) (standard); 650 long tons (660 t) (deep load)
- Length: 240 ft (73 m)
- Beam: 23 ft 6 in (7.16 m)
- Draught: 7 ft 10 in (2.39 m)
- Installed power: 7,403 ihp (5,520 kW); 2 double-ended Yarrow boilers
- Propulsion: 2 shafts, 2 vertical triple expansion steam engines
- Speed: 27 knots (31 mph; 50 km/h)
- Range: 3,700 nautical miles (6,900 km) at 14 knots (16 mph; 26 km/h)
- Complement: 130
- Armament: 2 × 4 in (102 mm) guns; 4 × 47 mm (3pdr) guns, mounting P Mark I, 2 × single torpedo tubes for 18 in (460 mm) torpedoes

Mato Grosso was a Pará-class destroyer of the Brazilian Navy, serving from 1909 to 1946. She was named after the Brazilian state of Mato Grosso.

== Description and Construction ==
Line drawing of the Pará class

In 1904 Brazil adopted an ambitious plan to renovate and modernize its Navy. The Naval Renovation Program was negotiated and enacted in December 1904 and envisioned acquisition of large number of vessels, including a dozen destroyers. In 1906 the program was modified reducing the total number of destroyers to ten. These ships became known as Pará-class destroyers.

The ship had an overall length of 240 feet (73.2 m), a beam of 23.5 feet (7.2 m) and a draught of 7 5/6 feet (2.4 m). She was powered by 2 triple expansion reciprocating steam engines, driving two shafts, which developed a total of 7,403 indicated horsepower (5,520 kW) and gave a maximum design speed of 27 knots (50 km/h; 31 mph). During the trials the contract speed was exceeded, and the vessel was clocked at 27.16 knots (50.30 km/h; 31.26 mph). Steam for the turbines was provided by two double-ended Yarrow boilers. Mato Grosso carried a maximum of 140 long tons (140 t) of coal that gave her a range of approximately 3,700 nautical miles (6,900 km; 4,300 mi) at 14 knots (26 km/h; 16 mph).

The ship mounted two 4 in (102 mm) guns in single mounts. In addition, four 47 mm (3pdr) cannons in single mounts were deployed at the time of launching.

Upon completion of sea trials, Mato Grosso was officially delivered to the Brazilian government on May 5, 1909, with Captain Augusto Theotonio Pereira serving as her commander. She left Glasgow on May 31, and headed to Gourock where she loaded ammunition and departed next day for Brazil. The destroyer stopped at Falmouth, Brest, Vigo, Lisbon and Las Palmas before arriving in St. Vicente on June 27. After spending 6 days at Cabo Verde, Mato Grosso departed from St. Vicente on July 3. Her trip to Brazil lasted a little over 5 days, and the destroyer had to brave some rough seas during the last leg of her journey. The ship arrived in Recife at approximately 18:00 on July 9, 1909 and was put into a drydock for repainting and re-coaling.

== Sources ==
- Gardiner, Robert and Randal Gray, eds. Conway's All the World's Fighting Ships 1906–1921. Annapolis: Naval Institute Press, 1985. ISBN 0-87021-907-3. OCLC 12119866.
- "CT Mato Grosso - CT 10." Navios De Guerra Brasileiros. Accessed 27 August 2017.
- "Mato Grosso I." Serviço de Documentação da Marinha — Histórico de Navios. Diretoria do Patrimônio Histórico e Documentação da Marinha, Departamento de História Marítima. Accessed 24 August 2017.
