= Brazilian destroyer Santa Catarina (1909) =

History

Brazil
- Name: Santa Catarina
- Namesake: Santa Catarina (Brazilian state)
- Ordered: 1904
- Builder: Yarrow
- Yard number: 1267
- Launched: 26 October 1909
- Sponsored by: Senhora Boiteux
- Completed: 1910
- Commissioned: 1910
- Decommissioned: 1944
- Identification: 9
- Fate: Scrapped

General characteristics
- Type: Pará-class destroyer
- Displacement: 560 long tons (570 t)
- Length: 240 ft (73 m)
- Beam: 23 ft 6 in (7.16 m)
- Draught: 7 ft 10 in (2.39 m)
- Installed power: 6,982 ihp (5,206 kW); 2 double-ended Yarrow boilers
- Propulsion: 2 shafts, 2 vertical triple-expansion steam engines
- Speed: 27 knots (31 mph; 50 km/h)
- Range: 3,700 nautical miles (6,900 km) at 14 knots (16 mph; 26 km/h)
- Complement: 130
- Armament: 2 × 4 in (102 mm) guns; 4 × 47 mm (3pdr) guns, mounting P Mark I; 2 × single torpedo tubes for 18 in (460 mm) torpedoes

Santa Catarina was a Pará-class destroyer of the Brazilian Navy, serving from 1910 to 1944. She was named after the Brazilian state of Santa Catarina.

== Description and Construction ==
Line drawing of the Pará class

The ship had an overall length of 240 feet (73.2 m), a beam of 23.5 feet (7.2 m), and a draught of 7 5/6 feet (2.4 m). She was powered by two triple-expansion reciprocating steam engines, driving two shafts, which developed a total of 6,982 indicated horsepower (5,206 kW) and provided a maximum design speed of 27 knots (50 km/h; 31 mph). During trials, the ship exceeded the contracted speed, reaching 27.30 knots (50.56 km/h; 31.42 mph). Steam for the engines was supplied by two double-ended Yarrow boilers. Santa Catarina carried a maximum of 140 long tons (140 t) of coal, giving her a range of approximately 3,700 nautical miles (6,900 km; 4,300 mi) at 14 knots (26 km/h; 16 mph).

The ship was armed with two 4 in (102 mm) guns in single mounts. Additionally, four 47 mm (3-pounder) cannons in single mounts were installed at the time of her launch.

The official full-speed trial for Santa Catarina took place on 2 February 1910 on the Skelmorlie deep-water measured mile at the mouth of the Clyde. During a continuous three-hour run with a 100-ton load, the ship exceeded her contract speed of 27 knots.

== Bibliography ==
- "Santa Catarina II." Serviço de Documentação da Marinha — Histórico de Navios. Diretoria do Patrimônio Histórico e Documentação da Marinha, Departamento de História Marítima. Accessed 27 August 2017.
- Scheina, Robert L. (1985). "Brazil". In Gray, Randal (ed.). Conway's All the World's Fighting Ships 1906–1921. Naval Institute Press. pp. 403–407. ISBN 0-87021-907-3. OCLC 12119866.
- "CT Santa Catarina - CT 9." Navios de Guerra Brasileiros. Accessed 27 August 2017.
