= Brazilian destroyer Piauí (1908) =

Brazilian destroyer served from 1909 to 1944

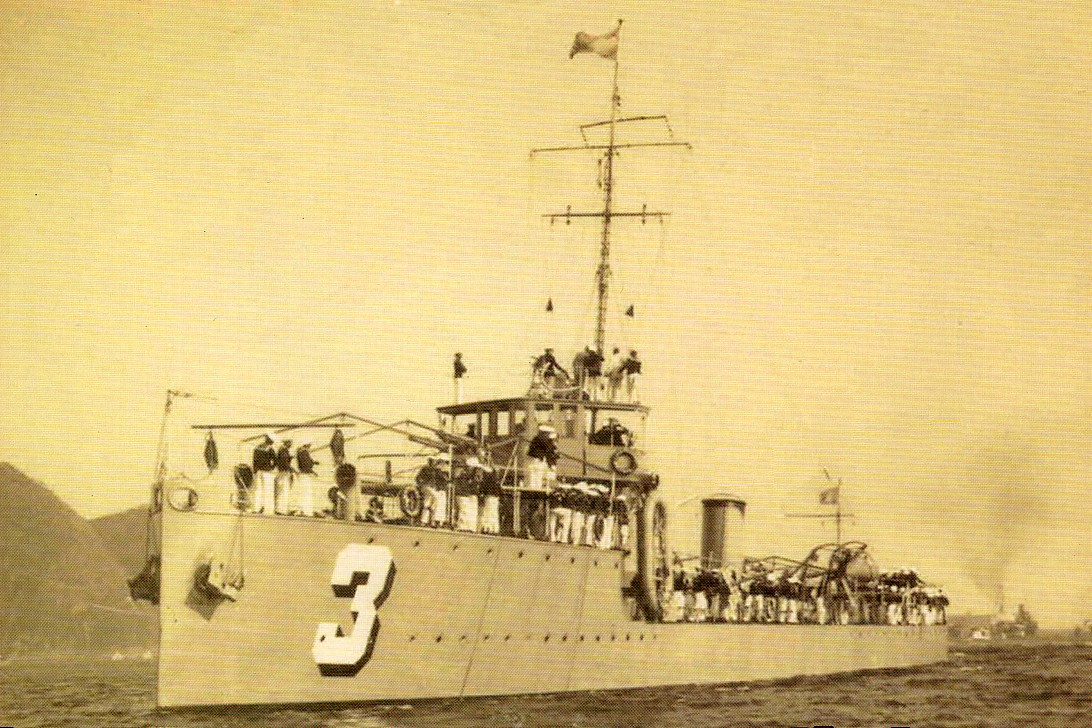

History

Brazil
- Name: Piauí
- Namesake: Piauí (Brazilian state)
- Ordered: June 1907
- Builder: Yarrow, Scotstoun
- Yard number: 1261
- Laid down: February 1908
- Launched: 7 September 1908
- Sponsored by: Senhora Burlamaqui
- Completed: 21 December 1908
- Decommissioned: 1944
- Stricken: 1944
- Identification: 3
- Fate: Scrapped

General characteristics
- Type: Pará-class destroyer
- Displacement: 560 long tons (570 t) (standard); 650 long tons (660 t) (deep load)
- Length: 240 ft (73 m)
- Beam: 23 ft 6 in (7.16 m)
- Draught: 7 ft 10 in (2.39 m)
- Installed power: 6,563 ihp (4,894 kW); 2 double-ended Yarrow boilers
- Propulsion: 2 shafts; 2 × 4-cylinder vertical triple expansion
- Speed: 27 knots (31 mph; 50 km/h)
- Range: 3,700 nautical miles (6,900 km) at 14 knots (16 mph; 26 km/h)
- Complement: 130
- Armament: 2 × 4 in (102 mm) guns; 4 × 47 mm (3pdr) guns, mounting P Mark I, 2 × single torpedo tubes for 18 in (460 mm) torpedoes

Piauí was a Pará-class destroyer of the Brazilian Navy, serving from 1909 to 1944. She was named after the Brazilian state of Piauí.

== Description and Construction ==
Line drawing of the Pará class

In 1904 Brazil adopted an ambitious plan to renovate and modernize its Navy. The Naval Renovation Program was negotiated and enacted in December 1904 and envisioned acquisition of large number of vessels, including a dozen destroyers. In 1906 the program was modified reducing the total number of destroyers to ten. These ships became known as Pará-class destroyers.

The ship had an overall length of 240 feet (73.2 m), a beam of 23.5 feet (7.2 m) and a draught of 7 5/6 feet (2.4 m). She was powered by 2 triple expansion reciprocating steam engines, driving two shafts, which developed a total of 6,563 indicated horsepower (4,894 kW) and gave a maximum design speed of 27 knots (50 km/h; 31 mph). During the trials the contract speed was exceeded, and the vessel was clocked at 27.21 knots (50.39 km/h; 31.31 mph). Steam for the turbines was provided by two double-ended Yarrow boilers. Piauí carried a maximum of 140 long tons (140 t) of coal that gave her a range of approximately 3,700 nautical miles (6,900 km; 4,300 mi) at 14 knots (26 km/h; 16 mph).

The ship mounted two 4 in (102 mm) guns in single mounts. In addition, four 47 mm (3pdr) cannons in single mounts were deployed at the time of launching.

Upon completion of sea trials, Piauí was officially delivered to the Brazilian government on 21 December 1908, with Captain Pedro de Frontin serving as her commander. She left Yarrow's yard on 28 December, and departed for Brazil on 31 December. The destroyer reached Falmouth in the morning of 2 January 1909, spent three days there, leaving for Vigo on 5 January and reaching it two days later. Piauí departed Vigo on 10 January for Lisbon where she arrived on the same day. The destroyer left Lisbon on 23 January and reached Las Palmas on 25 January. On 30 January she sailed out from Las Palmas for Cabo Verde, arriving in St. Vicente on 1 February. After spending four days in port, Piauí left St. Vicente on 5 February, and successfully arrived in Recife shortly after 11:00 on 10 February 1909. At about 04:00 on 14 February 1909 the ship departed Recife for Bahia where she arrived after a 21 hour journey.

== Bibliography ==
- Gardiner, Robert and Randal Gray, eds. Conway's All the World's Fighting Ships 1906–1921. Annapolis: Naval Institute Press, 1985. ISBN 0-87021-907-3. OCLC 12119866.
- "CT Piauhy - CT 3." Navios De Guerra Brasileiros. Accessed 27 August 2017.
