= Brazilian destroyer Rio Grande do Norte (1909) =

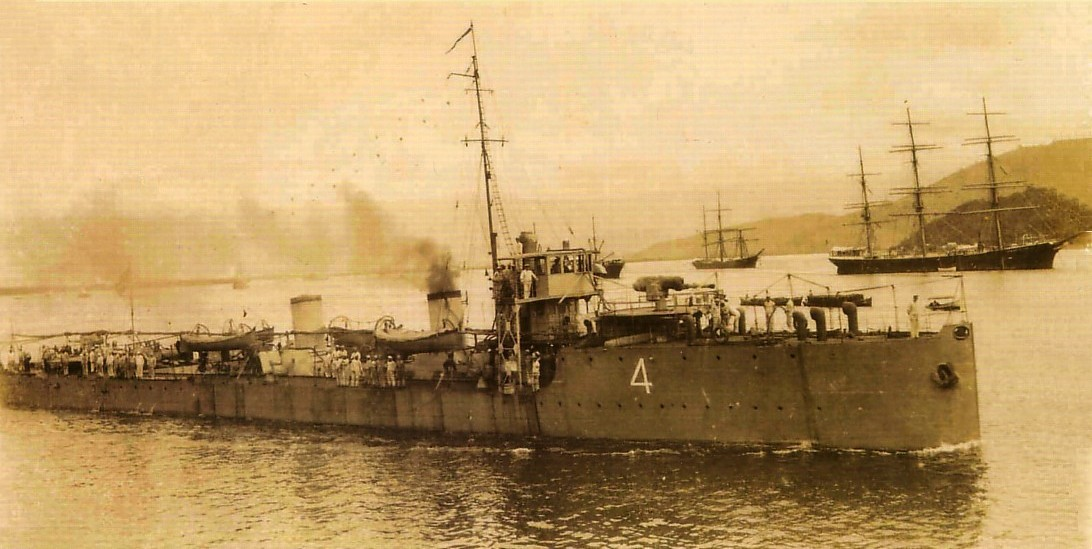

History

Brazil
- Name: Rio Grande do Norte
- Namesake: Rio Grande do Norte (Brazilian state)
- Ordered: 1904
- Builder: Yarrow, Scotstoun
- Yard number: 1264
- Launched: 9 March 1909
- Sponsored by: Madame Rosauro de Almeida
- Completed: 1909
- Decommissioned: 1944
- Identification: 4
- Fate: Scrapped

General characteristics
- Type: Pará-class destroyer
- Displacement: 560 long tons (570 t)
- Length: 240 ft (73 m)
- Beam: 23 ft 6 in (7.16 m)
- Draught: 7 ft 10 in (2.39 m)
- Installed power: 7,778 ihp (5,800 kW); 2 double-ended Yarrow boilers
- Propulsion: 2 shafts, 2 vertical triple expansion steam engines
- Speed: 27 knots (31 mph; 50 km/h)
- Range: 3,700 nautical miles (6,900 km) at 14 knots (16 mph; 26 km/h)
- Complement: 130
- Armament: 2 × 4 in (102 mm) guns; 4 × 47 mm (3pdr) guns, mounting P Mark I, 2 × single torpedo tubes for 18 in (460 mm) torpedoes

Rio Grande do Norte was a Pará-class destroyer of the Brazilian Navy, serving from 1909 to 1944. She was named after the Brazilian state of Rio Grande do Norte.

== Description and Construction ==
Line drawing of the Pará class

The ship had an overall length of 240 feet (73.2 m), a beam of 23.5 feet (7.2 m) and a draught of 7 5/6 feet (2.4 m). She was powered by 2 triple expansion reciprocating steam engines, driving two shafts, which developed a total of 7,778 indicated horsepower (5,800 kW) and gave a maximum design speed of 27 knots (50 km/h; 31 mph). During the trials the contract speed was exceeded, and the vessel was clocked at 27.27 knots (50.50 km/h; 31.38 mph). Steam for the turbines was provided by two double-ended Yarrow boilers. Rio Grande do Norte carried a maximum of 140 long tons (140 t) of coal that gave her a range of approximately 3,700 nautical miles (6,900 km; 4,300 mi) at 14 knots (26 km/h; 16 mph).

The ship mounted two 4 in (102 mm) guns in single mounts. In addition, four 47 mm (3pdr) cannons in single mounts were deployed at the time of launching.

== Bibliography ==
- "CT Rio Grande do Norte - CT 4." Navios De Guerra Brasileiros. Accessed 27 August 2017.
- Scheina, Robert L. (1985). "Brazil". In Gray, Randal (ed.). Conway's All the World's Fighting Ships 1906–1921. Naval Institute Press. pp. 403–407. ISBN 0-87021-907-3. OCLC 12119866.
