= Brazilian destroyer Amazonas (1908) =

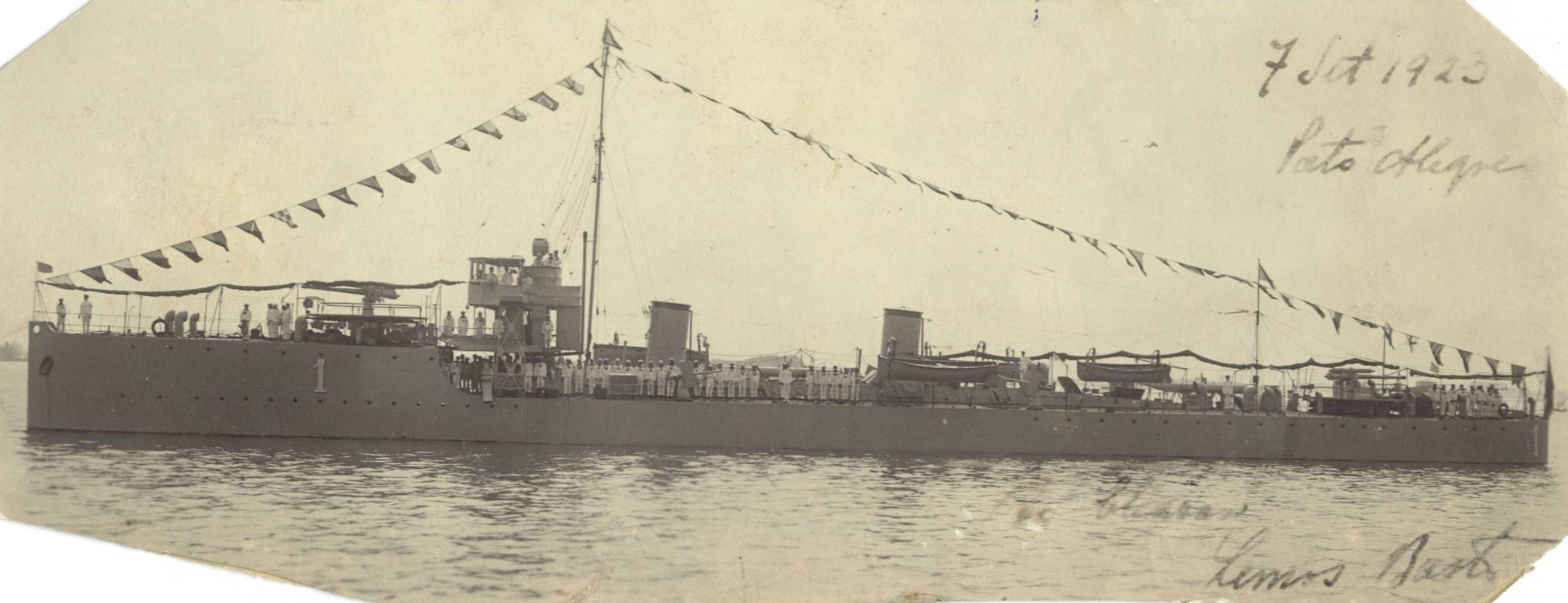

History

Brazil
- Name: Amazonas
- Namesake: Amazonas (Brazilian state)
- Ordered: June 1907
- Builder: Yarrow, Scotstoun
- Yard number: 1262
- Launched: 21 November 1908
- Sponsored by: Senhora Gomes Ferraz
- Completed: 1909
- Decommissioned: 1931
- Identification: 1
- Fate: Scrapped

General characteristics
- Type: Pará-class destroyer
- Displacement: 560 long tons (570 t) (standard); 650 long tons (660 t) (deep load)
- Length: 240 ft (73 m)
- Beam: 23 ft 6 in (7.16 m)
- Draught: 7 ft 10 in (2.39 m)
- Installed power: 6,898 ihp (5,144 kW); 2 double-ended Yarrow boilers
- Propulsion: 2 shafts, 2 vertical triple expansion steam engines
- Speed: 27 knots (31 mph; 50 km/h)
- Range: 3,700 nautical miles (6,900 km) at 14 knots (16 mph; 26 km/h)
- Complement: 130
- Armament: 2 × 4 in (102 mm) guns; 4 × 47 mm (3pdr) guns, mounting P Mark I, 2 × single torpedo tubes for 18 in (460 mm) torpedoes

Amazonas was a Pará-class destroyer of the Brazilian Navy, serving from 1909 to 1931. She was named after the Brazilian state of Amazonas.

== Description and Construction ==
Line drawing of the Pará class

In 1904 Brazil adopted an ambitious plan to renovate and modernize its Navy. The Naval Renovation Program was negotiated and enacted in December 1904 and envisioned acquisition of large number of vessels, including a dozen destroyers. In 1906 the program was modified reducing the total number of destroyers to ten. These ships became known as Pará-class destroyers.

The ship had an overall length of 240 feet (73.2 m), a beam of 23.5 feet (7.2 m) and a draught of 7 5/6 feet (2.4 m). She was powered by 2 triple expansion reciprocating steam engines, driving two shafts, which developed a total of 6,898 indicated horsepower (5,144 kW) and gave a maximum design speed of 27 knots (50 km/h; 31 mph). During the trials the contract speed was exceeded, and the vessel was clocked at 27.17 knots (50.32 km/h; 31.27 mph). Steam for the turbines was provided by two double-ended Yarrow boilers. Amazonas carried a maximum of 140 long tons (140 t) of coal that gave her a range of approximately 3,700 nautical miles (6,900 km; 4,300 mi) at 14 knots (26 km/h; 16 mph).

The ship mounted two 4 in (102 mm) guns in single mounts. In addition, four 47 mm (3pdr) cannons in single mounts were deployed at the time of launching.

The destroyer was launched on 21 November 1908 at Yarrow's yard in Scotstoun with Senhora Gomes Ferraz, wife of Captain Ferraz, serving as a sponsor. The official full speed trial for Amazonas took place on 29 December 1908 on the Skelmorlie deep-water measured mile at the mouth of the Clyde. During a continuous three hour run with a 100 ton load, the ship exceeded her contract speed of 27 knots.

Amazonas sailed from Glasgow on 24 April 1909, stopped off at Plymouth next day and had to spend six days there waiting for a good weather. From there she proceeded to Lisbon arriving there on 6 May and remained there for 10 days. From Lisbon the destroyer continued on to Las Palmas where she spent 6 more days, and then proceeded to St. Vicente. After staying in Cabo Verde for 4 days, the vessel left St. Vicente and after about 5 days arrived at Recife at approximately 14:00 on 2 June 1909. The ship departed Recife for Bahia at approximately 16:00 on 4 June 1909 after re-coaling with intention of being put into drydock for repainting, cleaning and inspection.

== Bibliography ==
- Gardiner, Robert and Randal Gray, eds. Conway's All the World's Fighting Ships 1906–1921. Annapolis: Naval Institute Press, 1985. ISBN 0-87021-907-3. OCLC 12119866.
- "CT Amazonas - CT 1." Navios De Guerra Brasileiros. Accessed 27 August 2017.
- "Amazonas." Serviço de Documentação da Marinha — Histórico de Navios. Diretoria do Patrimônio Histórico e Documentação da Marinha, Departamento de História Marítima. Accessed 19 August 2017.
