= Pará-class destroyer (1908) =

Class of Brazilian warships

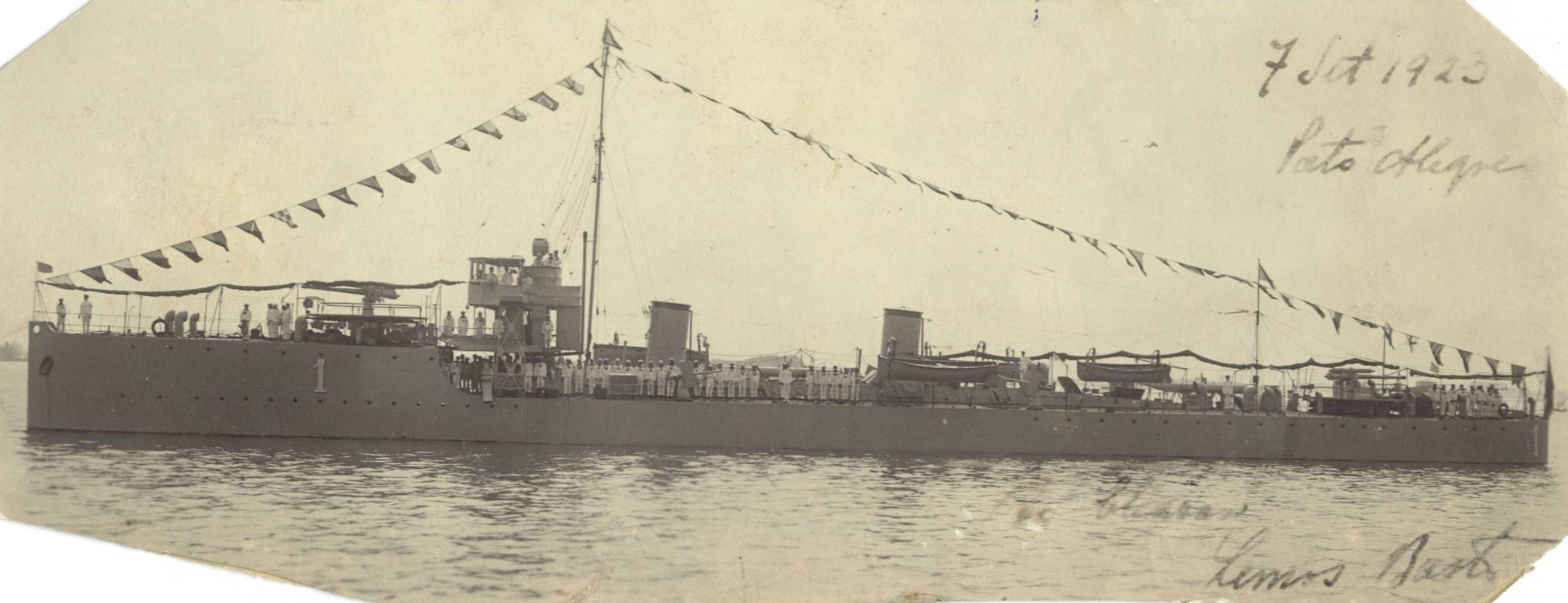
- The crew of Amazonas manning the rails during Independence Day celebrations, 1923.

Class overview
- Name: Pará class
- Builders: Yarrow
- Operators: Brazilian Navy
- Preceded by: Tamayo
- Succeeded by: Maranhão
- Built: 1908–1910
- In commission: 1908–1946
- Completed: 10
- Retired: 10

General characteristics
- Type: Destroyer
- Displacement: 560 long tons (570 t)
- Length: 240 ft (73 m)
- Beam: 23 ft 6 in (7.16 m)
- Draught: 7 ft 10 in (2.39 m)
- Installed power: 8,000 ihp (6,000 kW)
- Propulsion: Vertical triple expansion steam engines, 2 shafts
- Speed: 27 knots (50 km/h; 31 mph) design, 28.736 knots (53.219 km/h; 33.069 mph); at trials.
- Range: 3,700 nmi (6,900 km; 4,300 mi) at 14 knots (26 km/h; 16 mph)
- Complement: 130
- Armament: 2 × 4 in (102 mm) guns; 4 × 47 mm (3pdr) guns, mounting P Mark I, 2 × single torpedo tubes for 18 in (460 mm) torpedoes

The Pará-class destroyers were a class of ten destroyers built for the Brazilian Navy between 1908 and 1910 by Yarrow in the Scotstoun district of Glasgow, Scotland. All were named after states of Brazil. The class closely resembled the British River-class destroyers. All ten ships were ordered under the 1907 Naval Programme and exceeded the design speed during sea trials, the best being Parana. The class proved very maneuverable with a turning circle of 375 yards at full speed. The class served in both World War I and World War II.

== Design ==
Line drawing of the Pará class

The Pará class was designed for a crew of 104 men, powered by double shaft, four-cylinder VTE engines with two coal-fired Yarrow boilers which produced 8,000 shaft horsepower (6,000 kW). With a capacity of 140 tons of coal their range was 3,700 nautical miles (6,900 km; 4,300 mi) at 14 knots (26 km/h; 16 mph). They were armed with two 4 in (102 mm) guns, four 3-pounder guns, and two 18 in (460 mm) torpedo tubes.

All units exceeded their 27 knots (50 km/h; 31 mph) design speed; the best trial speed was Parana, at 28.736 knots (53.219 km/h; 33.069 mph). The ships were divided into ten watertight compartments by bulkheads from the outer bottom plating to the upper deck. The class proved to be very maneuverable; the diameter of the turning circle was 375 yd (343 m; 1,125 ft) at full speed and 340 yd (310 m; 1,020 ft) at two-thirds speed.

== Ships ==
Mato Grosso steaming at high speed

Ten ships were ordered under the 1907 Naval Program intended to modernize the navy; all built by Yarrow.

- Pará — launched 14 July 1908, stricken 1933.
- Piauí — launched 7 December 1908, stricken 1944.
- Amazonas — launched 21 November 1908, stricken 1931.
- Mato Grosso — launched 23 January 1909, stricken 1946.
- Rio Grande do Norte — launched 1909, stricken 1944.
- Paraíba — launched 18 May 1909, stricken 1944.
- Alagoas — launched 29 July 1909, disarmed 1939.
- Santa Catarina — launched 26 October 1909, stricken 1944.
- Paraná — launched 27 March 1910, disarmed 1933.
- Sergipe — launched 25 May 1910, stricken 1944.

== See also ==
- Pará-class destroyer (1959)
- Pará-class destroyer (1989)
- List of historical ships of the Brazilian Navy

== Sources ==
- Scheina, Robert L. (1985). "Brazil". In Gray, Randal (ed.). Conway's All the World's Fighting Ships 1906–1921. Naval Institute Press. pp. 403–407. ISBN 0-87021-907-3. OCLC 12119866.
- Scheina, Robert L. (2003). Latin America's Wars: Volume II, The Age of the Professional Soldier, 1900–2001. Brassey's. ISBN 1-57488-452-2. OCLC 53078537.
