= Battle of the Porpoises =

1918 Brazilian naval blunder

- Part of the Atlantic U-boat campaign of World War I
- A sketch of the Brazilian cruiser Bahia, responsible for the incident.
- Location: Gibraltar Strait
- Date: November 1918
- Victim: Porpoises
- Perpetrator: Crew of the Brazilian cruiser Bahia
- Motive: Misidentification of the porpoises as German U-boats

The Battle of the Porpoises (Portuguese: Batalha das Toninhas) is the name given to a military blunder involving the Brazilian Navy in the Gibraltar Strait, near the end of the First World War.

While on patrol for potential German submarines, the crew of the Bahia slaughtered a passing shoal of porpoises, mistaking them for the periscope of a U-boat. The porpoises had unexpectedly surfaced near the ship, prompting the crew to shoot at the animals.

== Context ==
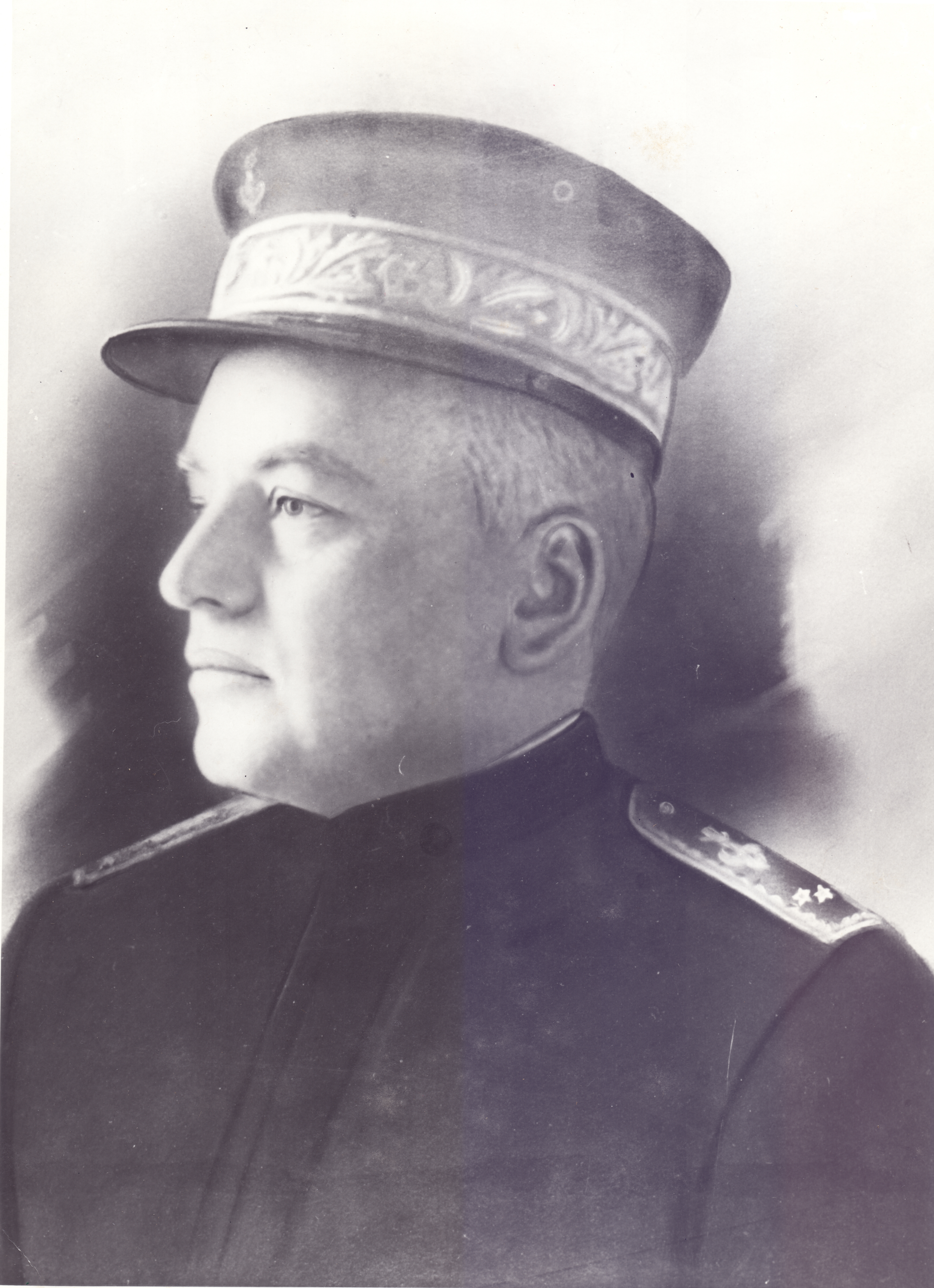
Rear Admiral Pedro de Frontin, commander of the cruiser during the incident

Near the end of the First World War, the ships of the Brazilian Naval Division for War Operations received orders from the British Admiralty to move to Gibraltar. Admiral Pedro de Frontin, commander of the cruiser Bahia, was warned to be careful while under operations, as the pre-dreadnought battleship HMS Britannia, designated to scout for the Brazilian flotilla, had recently been sunk by a German submarine. German U-boats posed a significant threat at the time, with a potentially large number of them being present in the area.

== The incident ==
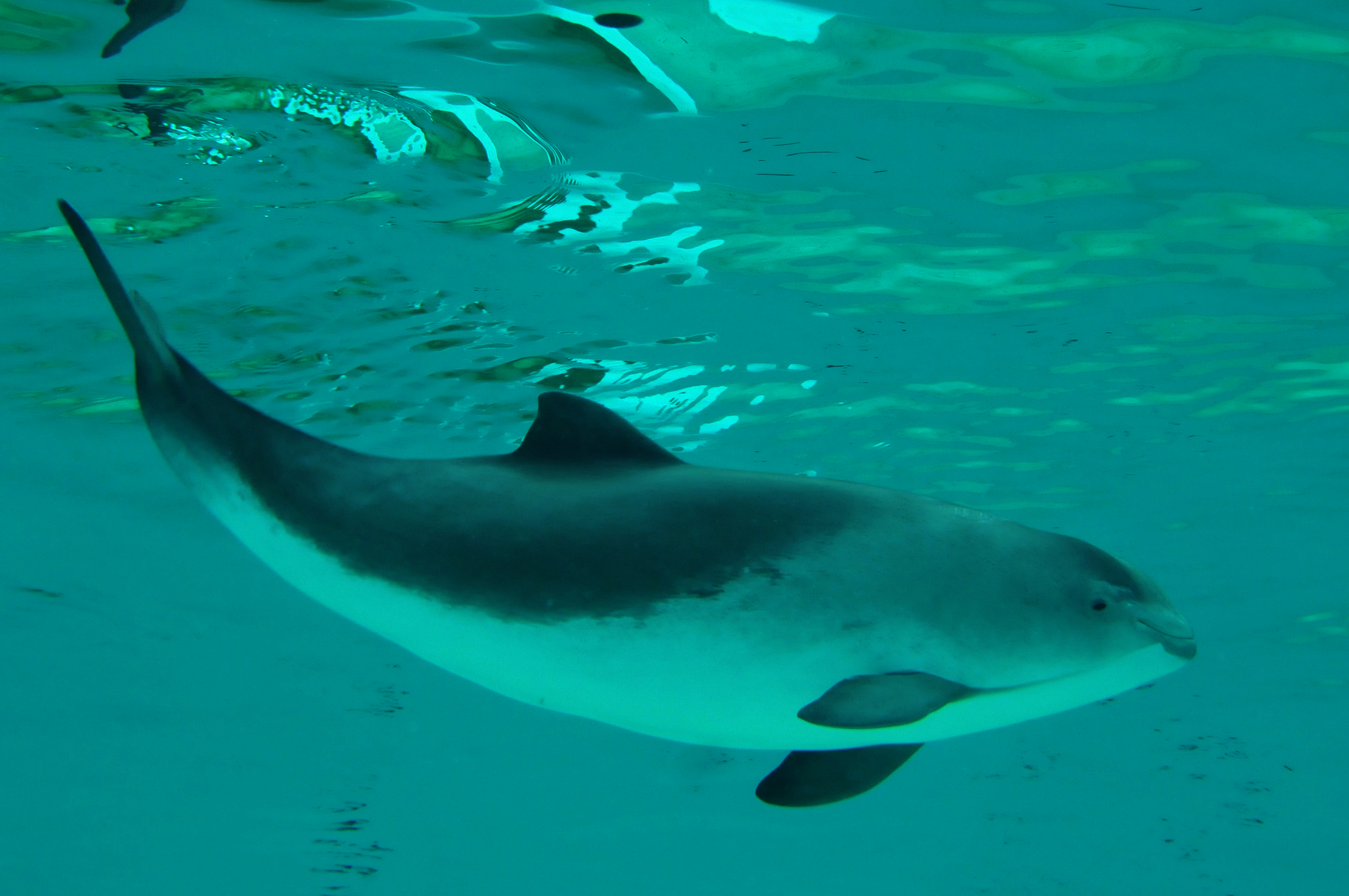
A harbour porpoise

During a night patrol, the watchman in the crew warned of a sighting of a periscope in the water. Fearing a potential German attack, the crewmen began firing upon the ocean blindly, trying to defend themselves from the German submarines. The waters turned red after minutes of continuous gunfire from the ship's artillery. What was initially thought to have been a German submarine periscope was, in reality, a shoal of porpoises. This was only determined after observing the bodies of the cetaceans floating on the surface.

== Explanations and similar incidents ==
At the time there were no electronic detection methods for submarines, and it is thought this may have contributed to the event. Such incidents of collateral damage are not uncommon in marine warfare, often caused by extreme tension and battle stress. A similar incident occurred during the Falklands War, more than six decades after. The British frigate HMS Brilliant, possessing modern electronic equipment, confused a pod of whales passing by for Argentinian submarines, firing upon the animals.

== See also ==
- Brazil during World War I

== Bibliography ==
- Daróz Carlos Roberto Carvalho. O Brasil Na Primeira Guerra Mundial : A Longa Travessia. São Paulo: Editora Contexto; 2016. ISBN 978-85-7244-952-6
