= Brazilian cruiser Bahia =

Brazilian scout cruiser

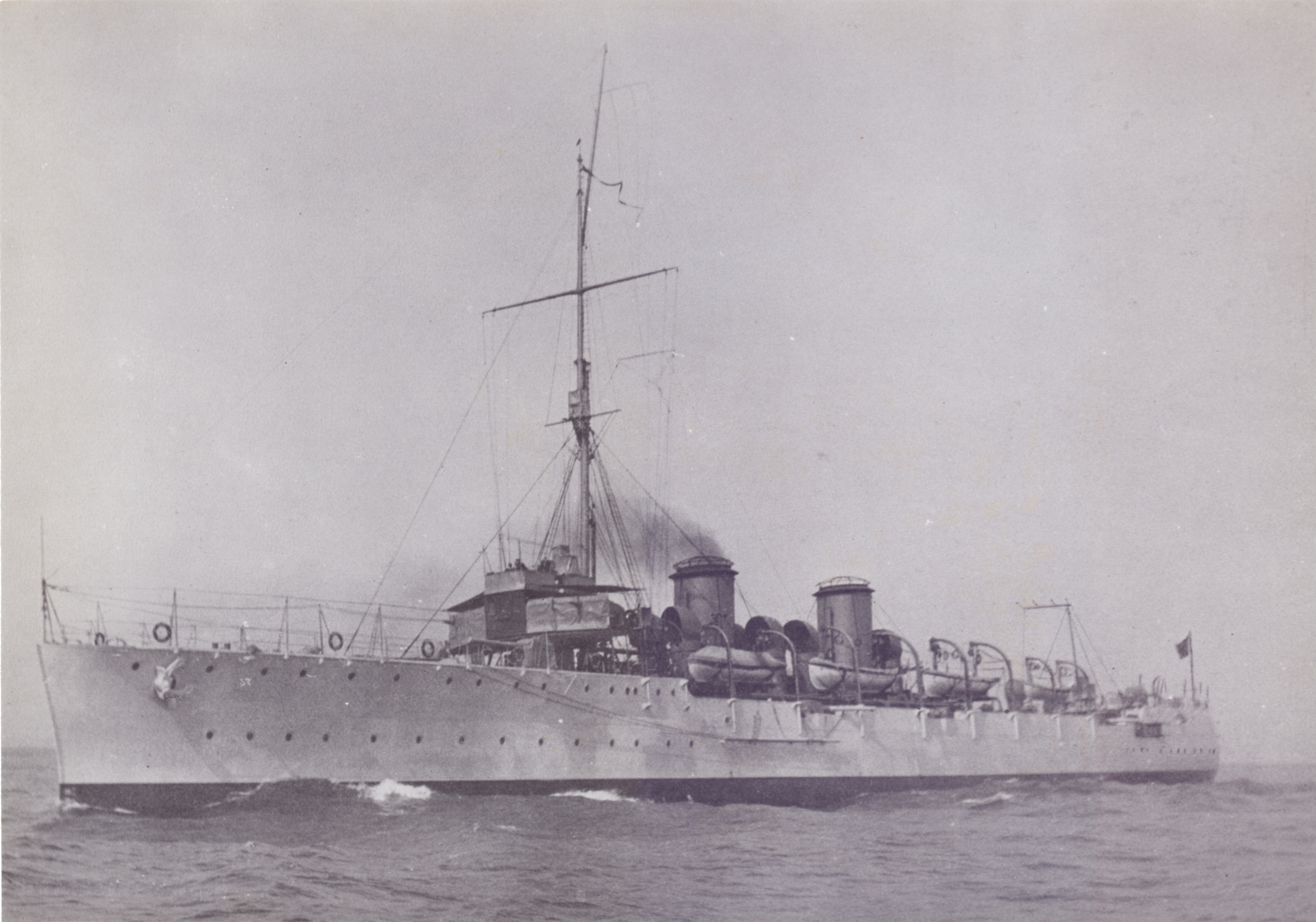
- Bahia sometime before its mid-1920s modernization, as indicated by its two funnels

History

Brazil
- Name: Bahia
- Namesake: State of Bahia
- Builder: Armstrong Whitworth
- Yard number: 809
- Laid down: 19 August 1907
- Launched: 20 January 1909
- Sponsored by: Madame Altino Correia
- Commissioned: 21 May 1910
- Fate: Sunk by an explosion, 4 July 1945

General characteristics (as built)
- Class & type: Bahia-class cruiser
- Displacement: 3,100 tonnes (3,050 long tons; 3,420 short tons)
- Length: 122.38 m (401.5 ft) oa; 115.82 m (380.0 ft) pp
- Beam: 11.89–11.91 m (39.0–39.1 ft)
- Draft: 3.81 m (12.5 ft) forward; 4.75 m (15.6 ft) amidships; 4.42 m (14.5 ft) aft
- Propulsion: Five Parsons steam turbines, ten Yarrow boilers; Coal normal 150 t (148 long tons; 165 short tons); Maximum 650 t (640 long tons; 717 short tons)
- Speed: 27.016 knots (50.034 km/h; 31.089 mph) trial; 25 knots (46 km/h; 29 mph) at full load
- Endurance: 1,400 nautical miles (2,600 km; 1,600 mi) at 23.5 knots (43.5 km/h; 27.0 mph); 3,500 nautical miles (6,500 km; 4,000 mi) at 10 knots (19 km/h; 12 mph)
- Complement: 320 to 357
- Armament: 10 × 120 mm (4.724 in)/50 caliber, 6 × 3-pounder 47 mm (1.85 in)/50 caliber, 2 × 457 mm (18.0 in) torpedo tubes
- Armor: Deck: 19 mm (0.748 in); Conning tower: 76 mm (2.992 in)

Bahia was the lead ship of a two-vessel class of cruisers built for Brazil by the British company Armstrong Whitworth. Crewmen mutinied in November 1910 aboard Bahia, Deodoro, Minas Geraes, and São Paulo, beginning the four-day Revolta da Chibata (Revolt of the Lash). Brazil's capital city of Rio de Janeiro was held hostage by the possibility of a naval bombardment, leading the government to give in to the rebel demands which included the abolition of flogging in the navy. During the First World War, Bahia and its sister ship Rio Grande do Sul were assigned to the Divisão Naval em Operações de Guerra (Naval Division in War Operations), the Brazilian Navy's main contribution in that conflict. The squadron was based in Sierra Leone and Dakar and escorted convoys through an area believed to be heavily patrolled by U-boats.

Bahia was extensively modernized in the mid-1920s. It received three new Brown–Curtis turbine engines and six new Thornycroft boilers, and it was converted from coal-burning to oil. The refit resulted in a striking aesthetic change, with the exhaust being trunked into three funnels instead of two. The armament was also modified, adding three 20 mm (0.79 in) Madsen autocannons, a 7 mm (0.28 in) Hotchkiss machine gun, and four 533 mm (21.0 in) torpedo tubes. In the 1930s, it served with government forces during multiple revolutions.

In the Second World War, Bahia was once again used as a convoy escort, sailing over 100,000 nautical miles (190,000 km; 120,000 mi) in the span of about a year. On 4 July 1945, it was acting as a plane guard for transport aircraft flying from the Atlantic to Pacific theaters of war. Bahia's gunners were firing at a kite for anti-aircraft practice when one aimed too low and hit depth charges stored near the stern of the ship, resulting in a massive explosion that incapacitated the ship and sank it within minutes. Only a few of the crew survived the blast, and fewer still were alive when their rafts were discovered days later.

== Construction and commissioning ==
Bahia by Oscar Parkes, c. 1910

Bahia was part of a large 1904 naval building program by Brazil. Also planned as part of this were the two Minas Geraes-class dreadnoughts, ten Pará-class destroyers, three submarines and a submarine tender. With a design that borrowed heavily from the British Adventure-class scout cruisers, Bahia's keel was laid on 19 August 1907 in Armstrong Whitworth's Elswick, Newcastle upon Tyne yard. Construction took about a year and a half, and she was launched on 20 January 1909 with Madame Altino Correia being the sponsor on behalf of Madame Dr. Araugo Pinho. (Note: There is some scholarly confusion about when Bahia and Rio Grande do Sul were launched. The Miramar Ship Index—using information from contemporary builders' records—and the Navios de Guerra Brasileiros record Bahia's launching date as 20 January 1909, and its sister ship Rio Grande do Sul's as 20 April 1909. Bahia's date is backed up by a contemporary news report from the Yorkshire Post and Leeds Intelligencer. Conway's All the World's Fighting Ships 1906–1921 wrongly reverses these dates, giving 20 January for Rio Grande do Sul and 20 April for Bahia. Confusing matters further, the Brazilian Navy's official history gives 19 April for Rio Grande do Sul's keel laying.) The process of fitting out pushed its completion date to 2 March 1910, after which it sailed to Brazil and arrived in Recife on 6 May. The new cruiser—the third ship of the Brazilian Navy to honor the state of Bahia—was commissioned into the navy shortly thereafter on 21 May 1910. As a class, Bahia and Rio Grande do Sul were the fastest cruisers in the world when they were commissioned, and the first in the Brazilian Navy to utilize steam turbines for propulsion.

== Mutiny ==
Brazil's economy was suffering from a severe recession at the same time Bahia was commissioned. This economic hardship, the racism prevalent in all branches of the Brazilian armed forces, and the severe discipline enforced on all navy ships, spawned a mutiny known as the Revolta da Chibata (Revolt of the Lash) among sailors on the most powerful ships.

Unhappy with the violent treatment they were receiving, black sailors on the dreadnought battleship Minas Geraes began planning an uprising early in 1910, choosing João Cândido—an experienced sailor later known as the "Black Admiral"—as their leader. In mid-November, a sailor was sentenced to be flogged in front of his fellow sailors, even though the practice had been banned by law. The punishment was administered and continued even after the sailor fainted, infuriating the nascent mutineers. Although they were not ready and could not revolt immediately, they quickened their preparations and rebelled on 21 November, earlier than originally planned. They killed several officers and the captain of Minas Geraes, while other officers were forced off the ship. The revolt quickly expanded to the battleship São Paulo, the elderly coastal defense ship Deodoro, and Bahia. While joining the revolt, the crew of the scout cruiser murdered one of their officers. During this time, discipline on the rebelling ships was not relaxed; daily drills were conducted and Felisberto ordered all liquor to be thrown overboard.

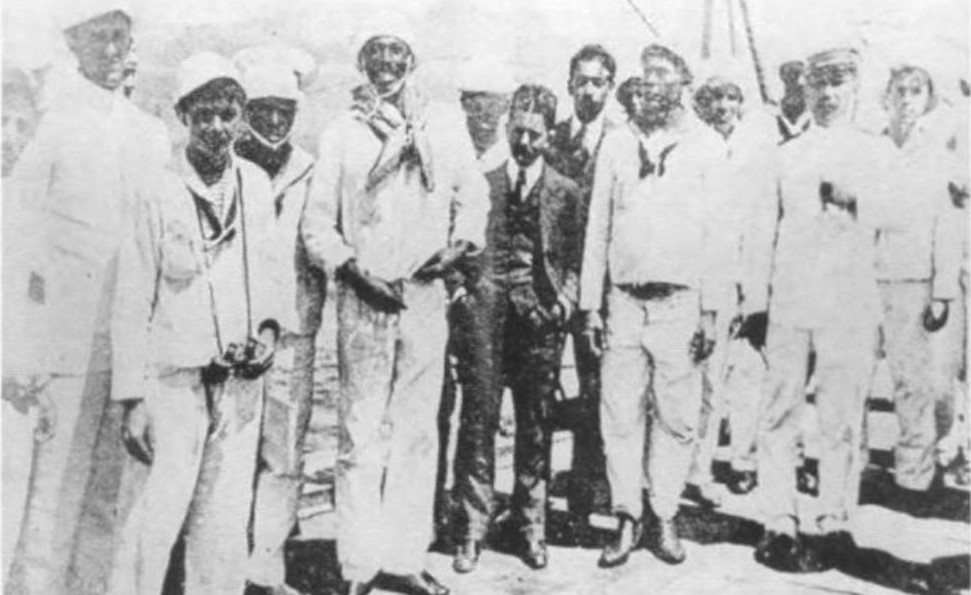
João Cândido with reporters, officers and sailors on aboard Minas Geraes on 26 November 1910, the final day of the rebellion.

The crews of the torpedo boats remained loyal to the government, and army troops moved to the presidential palace and the coastline, but neither group could stop the mutineers. The fact that many who manned Rio de Janeiro's harbor defenses were sympathetic to the mutineers' cause, coupled with chance that the capital might be bombarded by the mutinous ships, forced the National Congress of Brazil to give in to the rebels' demands. These included the abolition of flogging, improved living conditions, and the granting of amnesty to all mutineers. The government also issued official pardons and a statement of regret; its submission resulted in the rebellion's end on 26 November, when control of the four ships was handed back to the navy.

== First World War ==
In the opening years of the First World War, the Brazilian Navy was sent out to patrol the South Atlantic with French, British and American naval units, although its ships were not supposed to engage any threat outside territorial waters as Brazil was not at war with the Central Powers. The country also tried to ensure that it remained totally neutral; Bahia and Rio Grande do Sul were sent to Santos in August 1914 to enforce neutrality laws when it was reported that the German raider Bremen was lying in wait off that port for British and American merchant ships. (Note: The New York Times' article refers to Bremen, but that ship was in the Baltic Sea at the time. The only German cruiser in that area in August 1914 was Dresden. The misidentification was probably due to the fog of war.) Brazil joined the Entente and declared war on the Central Powers on 26 October 1917.

On 21 December 1917, the Brazilian Navy—at the behest of the British—formed a small naval force with the intent of sending it to the other side of the Atlantic. On 30 January 1918, Bahia was made the flagship of the newly organized Divisão Naval em Operações de Guerra (Naval Division in War Operations, abbreviated as DNOG), under the command of Rear Admiral Pedro de Frontin. The other ships assigned to the squadron were Bahia's sister Rio Grande do Sul, Pará-class destroyers Piauí, Paraíba, Rio Grande do Norte and Santa Catarina, tender Belmonte, and tugboat Laurindo Pita.

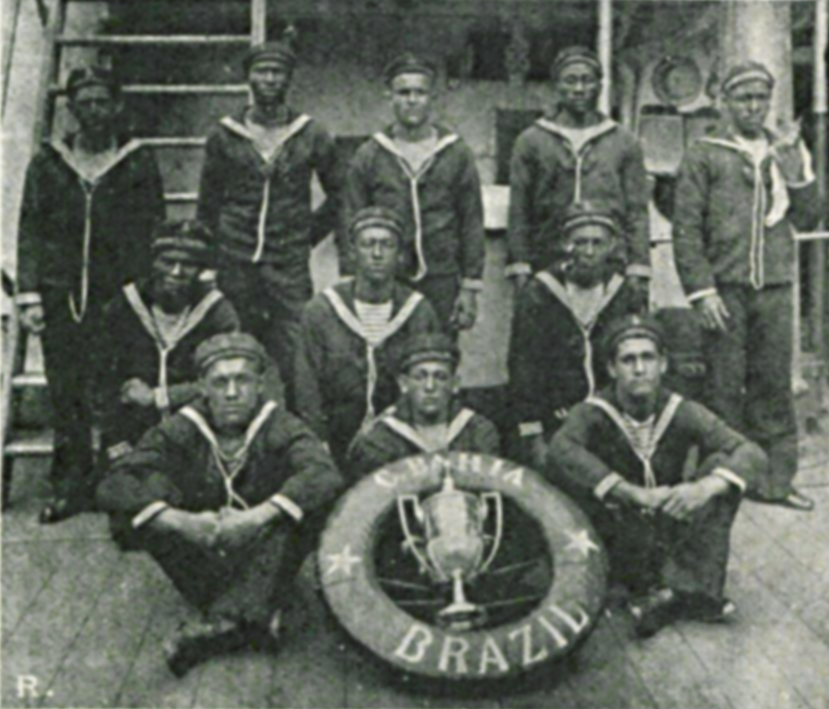
Crewmen aboard Bahia, 1917

The DNOG sailed for the British colony of Sierra Leone on 31 July. Since other allied countries helped with logistics, little was provided by Brazil aside from the ships themselves and the men crewing them. Despite the threat of a U-boat attack, they were forced to stop several times so Belmonte could transfer necessities such as coal and water to the other ships. They reached Freetown safely on 9 August and remained in the port until 23 August when they departed for Dakar. While on this section of the voyage, Bahia, Rio Grande do Sul, Rio Grande do Norte, Belmonte and Laurindo Pita spotted an apparent torpedo heading for Belmonte, but it missed. Rio Grande do Norte then fired several shots and depth-charged what the force believed to be a U-boat. While the official Brazilian history of the ship definitively claims to have sunk a submarine, author Robert Scheina notes that this action was never confirmed, and works published about U-boat losses in the war do not agree. During the so-called Battle of the Porpoises the cruiser killed several porpoises it mistook for an U-boat.

After arriving in Dakar on 26 August, the DNOG was tasked with patrolling a triangle with corners at Dakar, Cape Verde and Gibraltar; the Allies believed that this area was rife with U-boats waiting for convoys to pass through. As such, the Brazilian unit's mission was to patrol for mines laid by German minelaying submarines and to make sure that convoys passing through would be safe. Complications arose when both Bahia and Rio Grande do Sul had problems with their condensers, a matter which was made much worse by the hot, tropical climate in which the ships were serving.

In early September, the squadron was struck by the Spanish flu pandemic. The contagion began aboard Bahia, spread to the other ships of the squadron and remained present for seven weeks. At one point, 95% of some of the ships' crews were infected; 103 died overseas, and 250 died in Brazil after returning there. On 3 November, Bahia, three of the four destroyers, and the tugboat were sent to Gibraltar for operations in the Mediterranean Sea. They arrived on 9 or 10 November, (Note: Sources give different dates; the Navios de Guerra Brasileiros and Israel's Dictionary of American Naval Fighting Ships entry give 9 November, while Scheina gives 10 November.) escorted by the American destroyer Israel, but the fighting ceased on the 11th when the Armistice with Germany was signed. Sometime in early 1919, Bahia, accompanied by four destroyers, voyaged to Portsmouth, England; they then traveled across the English Channel to Cherbourg, arriving there on 15 February. The commander of the squadron, Admiral Pedro de Frontin, met with the Maritime Prefect prior to the commencement of "social events"; these lasted until 23 February, when the ships moved to Toulon and de Frontin journeyed overland to Paris. The DNOG was dissolved on 25 August 1919.

== Modernization and inter-war years ==
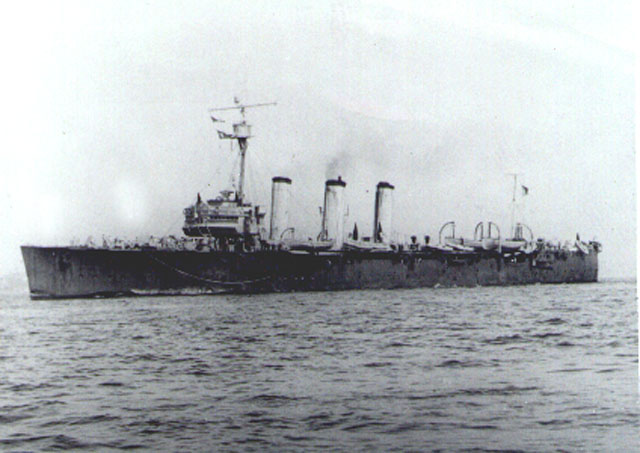
Bahia sometime after its major modernization; the addition of a funnel was a striking change to the ship's appearance

In 1925–26, (Note: The official history of the ship gives a 1924–1927 range, while Scheina in Conway's and Navios de Guerra Brasileiros give 1925–1926. Additional collaborating evidence for the latter date can be found in a June 1926 Ludington Daily News article which reported that Bahia was going to visit the United States—implying that the ship had been placed back into service.) Bahia underwent significant modernization. The original five turbines were replaced by three Brown–Curtis turbines, while the original ten boilers were replaced by six Thornycroft oil-burning boilers, which necessitated the addition of a third funnel. The former coal bunkers, along with some of the space freed up by the decrease in boilers, were converted to hold 588,120 litres (155,360 US gal) of oil. These modifications resulted in Bahia's top speed increasing to 28 knots (52 km/h). All of the boats on board were replaced, and three 20 mm (0.79 in) Madsen guns, a 7 mm (0.28 in) Hotchkiss machine gun, and four 533 mm (21.0 in) torpedo tubes were added to give the ship a defense against aircraft and more power against surface ships, respectively. Still, in 1930 The New York Times labeled Bahia and the other warships in Brazil's navy as "obsolete" and noted that nearly all were "older than the ages considered effective by powers signatory to the Washington and London Naval Treaties."

On 28 June 1926, the Ludington Daily News reported that Bahia would pay a visit to Philadelphia, accepting an invitation from the United States government to participate in the sesquicentennial celebrations. (Note: There appears to have been no follow-up article on what occurred after Bahia arrived.) In mid-1930, Bahia and Rio Grande do Sul—under the command of Heráclito Belford Gomes—escorted Brazil's President-elect Júlio Prestes to the United States. Traveling on board the Brazilian-Lloyd ocean liner Almirante Jacequay, Prestes was returning American then-President-elect Herbert Hoover's visit to Brazil in December 1928. The cruisers USS Trenton and Marblehead met the three ships about 100 miles (160 km) off Sandy Hook and honored Prestes with a 21-gun salute. After spending five hours in the Ambrose Channel due to fog, Prestes traveled on a launch to a pier, during which Bahia rendered one 21-gun salute and Fort Jay offered two. After arriving ashore, he traveled to City Hall before speeding down to Washington, D.C. He stayed in the United States for eight days before departing for France on the White Star Line's Olympic. Bahia and Rio Grande do Sul were berthed at the Brooklyn Navy Yard for the visit.

During the Revolution of 1930, Bahia served with Rio Grande do Sul—until that ship defected—and five or six destroyers off the coast of Santa Catarina; they were once again commanded by Belford Gomes. (Note: Rio Grande do Sul defected at an unknown date, and Bahia may have as well; on 6 October, a rebel general claimed that both ships had defected.) Two years later, when the state of São Paulo rebelled in the Constitutionalist Revolution, Bahia—under the command of Frigate Captain Lucas Alexandre Boiteux—and other vessels blockaded the rebel-held port of Santos. Bahia was under repair from 1934 into 1935. In November 1935, Bahia and Rio Grande do Sul sailed to Natal, the capital of Rio Grande do Norte, to lend support against another rebellion. As part of their mission, they were ordered to sink the steamship Santos on sight, as several escaping leaders of the revolution were on board.

From 17 to 22 May 1935, Bahia and Rio Grande do Sul—joined at an unknown point by the Argentine battleships Rivadavia and Moreno, the heavy cruisers Almirante Brown and Veinticinco de Mayo, and five destroyers—escorted São Paulo, with Brazilian President Getúlio Vargas embarked, up the Río de la Plata (River Plate) to Buenos Aires, the capital of Argentina. Vargas was returning visits from the presidents of Argentina and Uruguay, Agustín Pedro Justo and Gabriel Terra. Vargas and Justo planned to be present at the opening session of the Pan-American Commercial Conference on 26 May, and open a Chaco War peace conference, before São Paulo conveyed Vargas to Montevideo, Uruguay for meetings with Terra.

On 2 March 1936, Bahia escorted Veinticinco de Mayo, which had the Argentine Navy Minister Rear Admiral Eleazar Videla embarked, and Almirante Brown in the last part of their journey to Rio de Janeiro.

== Second World War ==
After Brazil's entrance into the Second World War on 21 August 1942, which took effect on 31 August, Bahia was used extensively during the Atlantic campaign for 67 escorts and 15 patrols. In total, it traveled 101,971 nmi (188,850 km; 117,346 mi) in 358 days, and played a role in shepherding over 700 merchant ships. It and Rio Grande do Sul were labeled by the United States Naval Institute's magazine Proceedings as being "oversized destroyers" that were "relatively slow".

Bahia was modernized again twice during the war, in both 1942 and 1944; these modernizations were not as extensive as those of the 1920s. Two of its 47 mm (1.9 in) guns were replaced with 76 mm (3.0 in) L/23 AA guns, its Madsen guns were replaced with seven Oerlikon 20 mm cannons in single mounts, and a director for these guns was installed. Two depth charge tracks were added, improved range-finders were added to the 120 mm (4.7 in) guns, and sonar and radar were fitted, in addition to other minor modifications. (Note: Regarding the installation of sonar, it is not clear whether it was fitted for the first time in 1942 (and used in the 10 July depth charging) or whether a more modern sonar replaced an outmoded version in either 1942 or 1944.) The Brazilian Navy's official history of the ship reports these modifications, but does not specify which were undertaken in which year.

On 3 June 1943, while Bahia was escorting the convoy BT 12, it located an underwater mine and destroyed it using a 20 mm (0.79 in) Madsen gun. On 10 July, while at 26°15′S 43°35′W, Bahia received a sonar contact and depth-charged what the Brazilian Navy's official history of the ship reports might have been the German submarine U-199, which was sunk later that month in the same area (off Rio de Janeiro) by American and Brazilian aircraft. In November 1944, Bahia joined the American light cruiser Omaha and destroyer escort Gustafson in escorting the troopship General M. C. Meigs, which was carrying the 4th transportation of the Brazilian Expeditionary Force's troops heading to Italy.

=== Loss ===
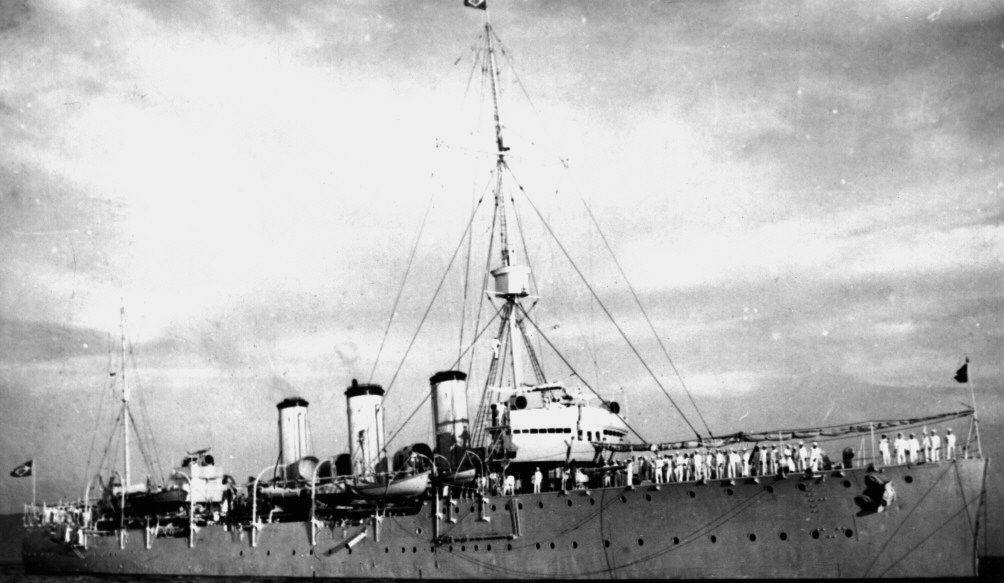
A profile of Bahia at some point after its 1920s modernization; note the men congregated on the foredeck

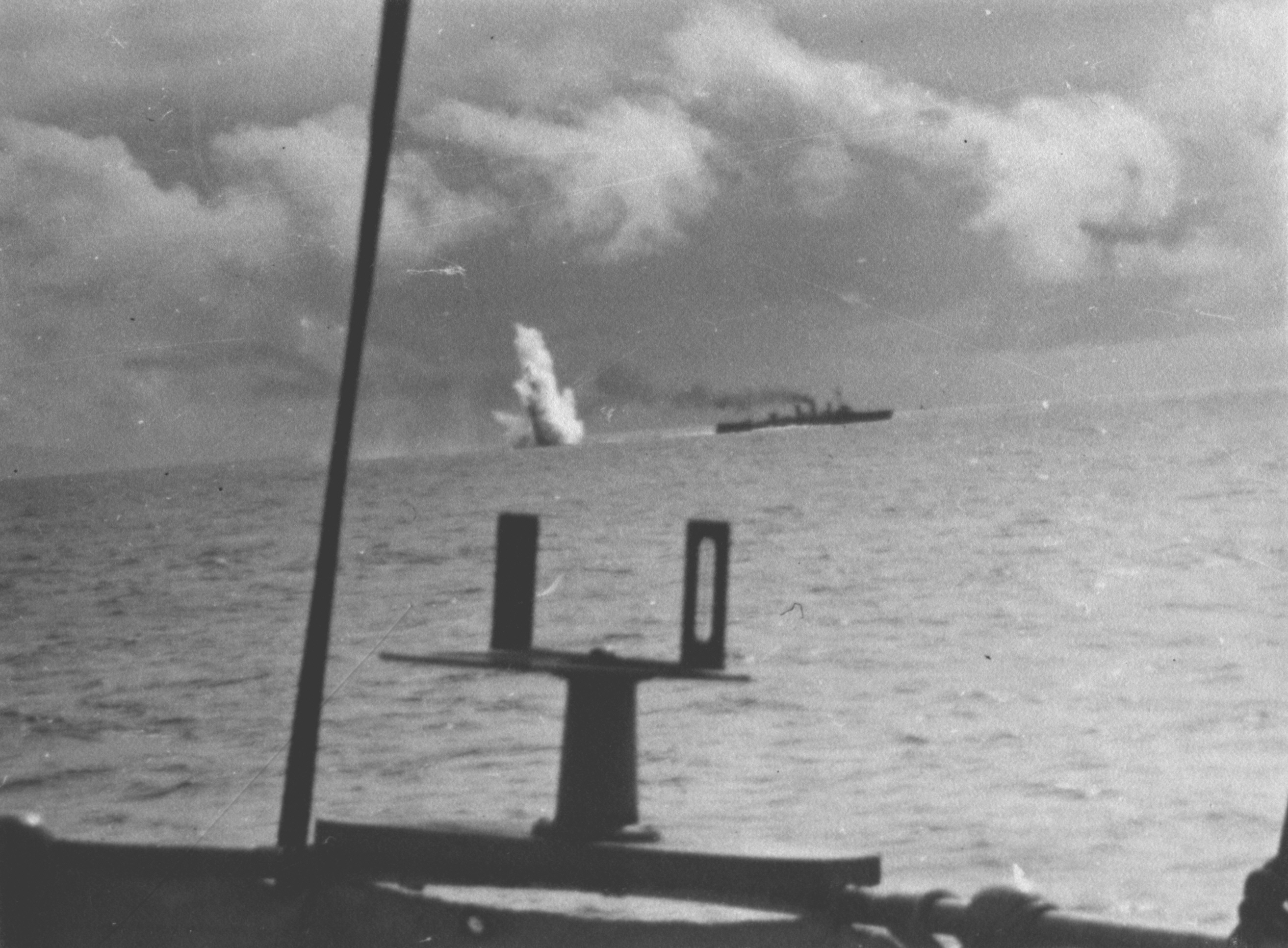
Bahia dropping depth charges, presumably during a naval exercise; an accident with one such charge led to the ship's sinking

Allied warships were assigned to patrol in the Atlantic as rescue ships at the end of hostilities in the European theater, stationed near routes frequented by military transport aircraft carrying personnel from Europe to the continuing war in the Pacific. Bahia was one such ship, stationed northeast of Brazil around 0°N 30°W near the Saint Peter and Saint Paul Archipelago on 4 July 1945. Crewmen were conducting anti-aircraft target practice, firing the ship's 20 mm guns at a kite that was being towed behind the ship. One of them shot it down, but also accidentally hit the depth charges on the stern; the ship lacked guide rails that would normally prevent the guns from being aimed at the ship. The resulting explosion knocked out all power on the ship and sank it in about three minutes.

The survivors of the blast endured four or five days of no food, high temperatures, and full exposure to the sun on their makeshift rafts. The New York Times reported that some were driven mad by these conditions and simply jumped into the water, where they were devoured by sharks. From this point on, sources vary greatly. According to an article in Time magazine, Bahia's loss was not discovered until 8 July, when 22 survivors were picked up by the freighter Balfe. (Note: The magazine also reports that additional survivors were rescued over the next few days, but does not give a definitive figure. The Navios de Guerra Brasileiros, however, states that a total of 36 survivors were rescued by Balfe on the 8th.) Naval historian Robert Scheina contends that the disaster was revealed when Rio Grande do Sul arrived on station four days after the sinking to take Bahia's place and could not find it.

Sources also vary slightly on the number rescued and final death toll. The official history of the ship gives 36 rescued and 336 dead, and the Navios de Guerra Brasileiros gives 36 and 339. (Note: These figures contradict other information present in the article. Navios first says that 339 died of 372 total crewmembers, meaning that 33 survived, but the subsequent sentence states directly that 36 survived.) Contemporaneous news articles also published varying numbers; The Evening Independent stated that the ship carried 383 men, though it did not give any more information. The New York Times gave figures of 28 saved and 347 lost, while the St. Petersburg Times gave 32 and 395. Sources do agree that four American sound technicians were killed.

Rescued crewmen believed that they had hit a mine which detonated one of the ship's magazines. Vice Admiral Jorge Dodsworth Martins, Brazil's chief of naval intelligence, thought that Bahia could have been mined or torpedoed by U-530, which surrendered under strange circumstances in Mar del Plata, Argentina on 10 July (some two months after Germany's surrender), but the Argentine Naval Ministry stated that it would have been impossible for the submarine to travel from the site of the sinking to Mar del Plata in six days (4–10 July). (Note: Rumors persist that either U-530 or U-977 sank Bahia.) U-977 was also heading to Argentina seeking asylum, and it was also accused of sinking Bahia, but military investigations by the US and Brazilian navies concluded that the cruiser had been sunk due to the gunnery accident.

== See also ==
- USS Indianapolis (CA-35), a U.S. heavy cruiser, also sunk in July 1945, whose survivors endured circumstances similar to Bahia's.
- List of historical ships of the Brazilian Navy

== Sources ==
- Brook, Peter (1999). Warships for Export: Armstrong Warships 1867–1927. Gravesend, Kent, UK: World Ship Society. ISBN 0-905617-89-4.
- Moore, John, ed. Jane's Fighting Ships of World War I. London: Random House [Jane's Publishing Company], 2001 [1919]. ISBN 1-85170-378-0. OCLC 48257502.
- Rohwer, Jürgen. Chronology of the War at Sea, 1939–1945: The Naval History of World War Two. Naval Institute Press, 2005. p. 423
- Scheina, Robert L. "Brazil" in Gardiner, Robert; Gray, Randal, eds. Conway's All the World's Fighting Ships 1906–1921. Annapolis: Naval Institute Press, 1985. ISBN 0-87021-907-3. OCLC 12119866.
- Scheina, Robert L. Latin America's Wars: Volume II, The Age of the Professional Soldier, 1900–2001. Washington D.C.: Brassey's, 2003. ISBN 1-57488-452-2. OCLC 53078537.
- Smallman, Shawn C. Fear & Memory in the Brazilian Army and Society, 1889–1954. Chapel Hill: University of North Carolina Press, 2002. ISBN 0-8078-5359-3. OCLC 250188940.
- Whitley, M.J. Cruisers of World War Two: An International Encyclopedia. Annapolis: Naval Institute Press, 1995. ISBN 1-55750-141-6. OCLC 34089382.
