= Pedro de Frontin =

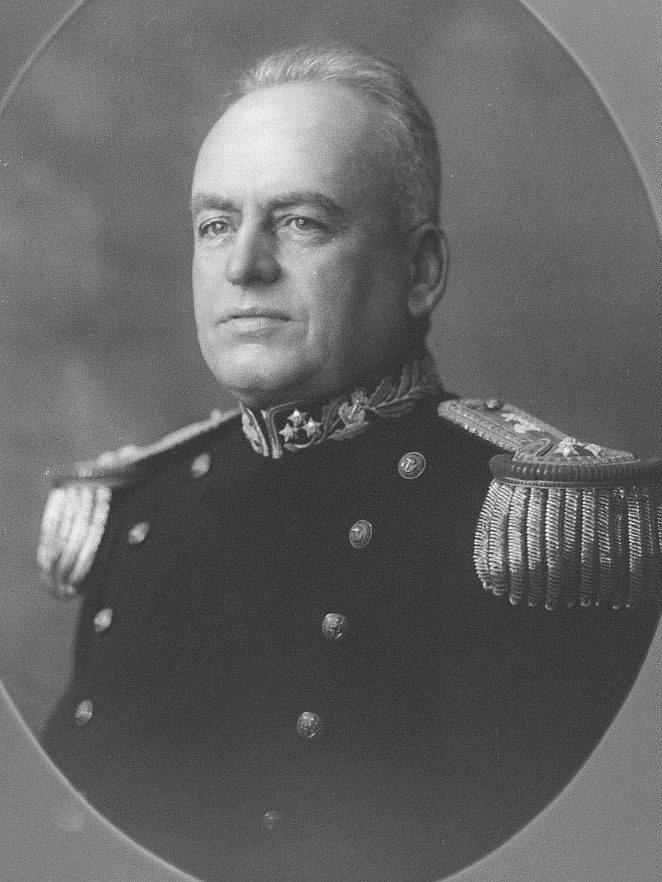
- Born: 8 February 1867; Petrópolis, Rio de Janeiro, Empire of Brazil
- Died: 7 April 1939 (aged 72); Rio de Janeiro, Federal District, Brazil
- Military career
- Allegiance: Empire of Brazil; Brazil
- Branch: Brazilian Navy
- Service years: 1882–1938
- Rank: Admiral
- Commands: Naval Division in War Operations; Naval War Scholl; Staff of the Navy; 2nd Naval Division; Corps of National Sailors; Division of Battleships
- Conflicts: World War I
- Awards: US Gold Medal of Distinction; Cross of II Leopold of Belgium; Gold Medal of Military Valour; First Class of the Japanese Empire
- Other work: Justice of the Superior Military Court

Pedro Max Fernando de Frontin (8 February 1867 – 7 April 1939) was a Brazilian Admiral. Frontin fought alongside the Triple Entente during World War I.

Still occupied the post of Naval Chief Officer, Minister of Military Justice, Director of the Brazilian Naval School for Officials, Commander of the Brazilian Marine Corps, Commander of the Second Naval Division.

== Early life ==
Pedro Max Fernando de Frontin was born on 8 February 1867 in Petrópolis. His parents were French immigrants João Gustavo de Frontin and Eulália Hyppolite Rose de Frontin.

== Navy Career and First World War ==
Admitted in the Naval School on 3 March 1882 at the age of fifteen, he obtained all his promotions by merit, since he reached the grade of Lieutenant, Junior Grade or "Primeiro-Tenente", on 8 January 1890. During his career, he commanded the warships São Paulo, Rio Grande do Sul, Bahia, and Piauí, as well as Laurindo Pitta.

Admiral Frontin was also the Chief Commander of the Brazilian Naval Division during 1918 in World War I, on the side of the Triple Entente. The Brazilian fleet under his charge operated from the North African Coast to the Mediterranean Sea. It stood in the operations together with British, French, Japanese and U.S. Navies.

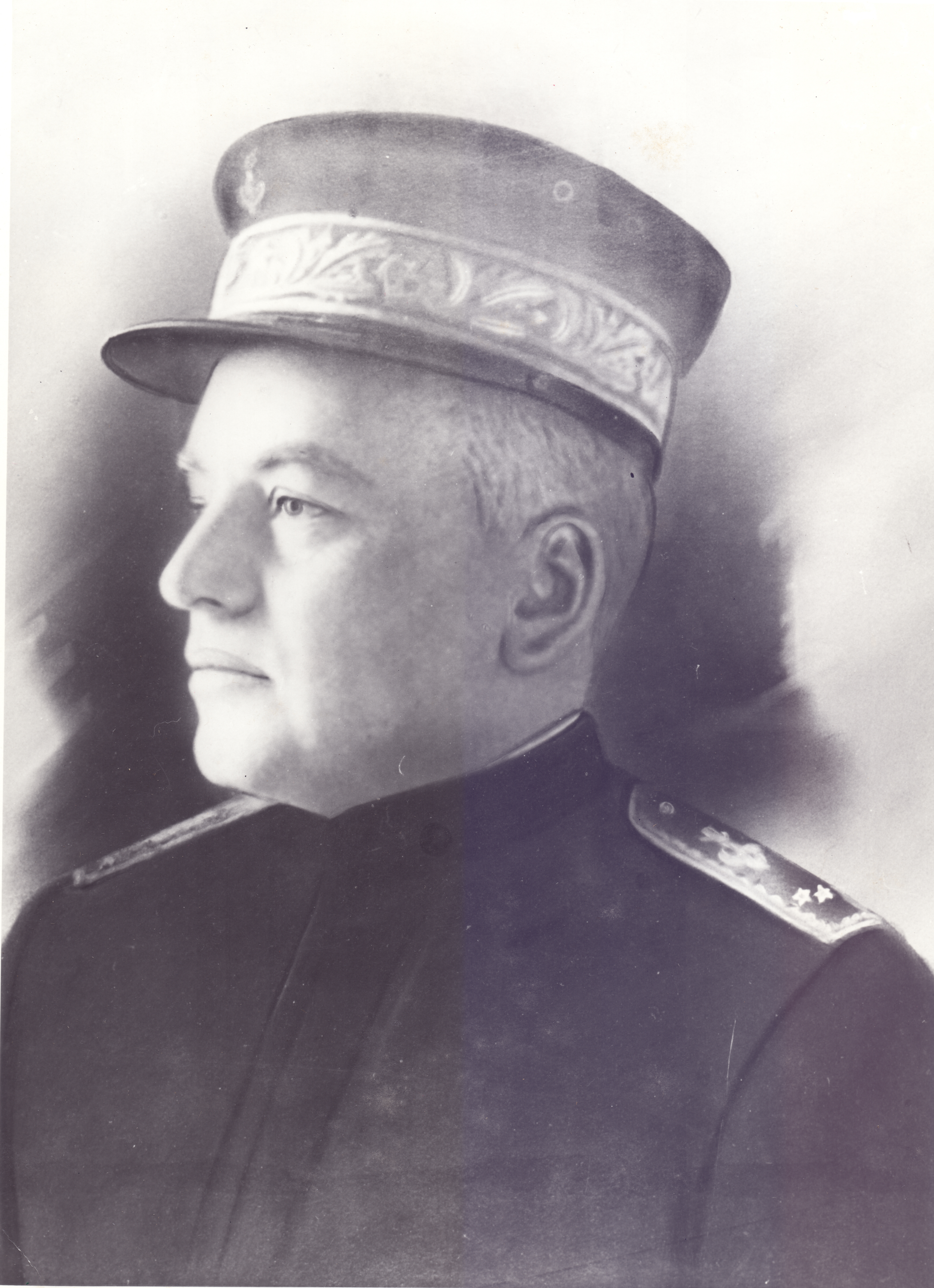
Admiral de Frontin wearing a typical French military cap, 1918

During his life, he was decorated with the U.S. Distinction Golden Medal for his services during World War I, Cross of the Leopold II of Belgium; Italy's Golden medal; First Class of Japanese Empire.

He also held the positions of Chief of Staff of the Navy, Minister of the Superior Military Tribunal, Director of the Naval War School, Commander of the National Sailors Corps, Commander of the 2nd Naval Division and Commander of the Battles Division. He was minister of the Superior Military Court between 1926 and 1938. He was president of the court between 18 July 1934 and 19 February 1938, the date of his retirement. He died a little more than one after his estrangement.

One of his famous quotes was: "When it is not possible to do what you have to do, you must do all your can!".

He died on 6 April 1939, in Rio de Janeiro.

== See also ==
- Brazil during World War I
- Brazilian Navy
- Brazilian Expeditionary Force World War II

== Bibliography ==
- Maia, Prado (1961). D.N.O.G. (Divisão Naval em Operações de Guerra), 1914-1918: uma página esquecida da história da Marinha Brasileira. Serviço de Documentação Geral da Marinha.
- Vultos da História Naval, Rio de Janeiro, SDGM.
