= Brazilian tugboat Laurindo Pitta =

Brazilian museum ship, former navy tugboat

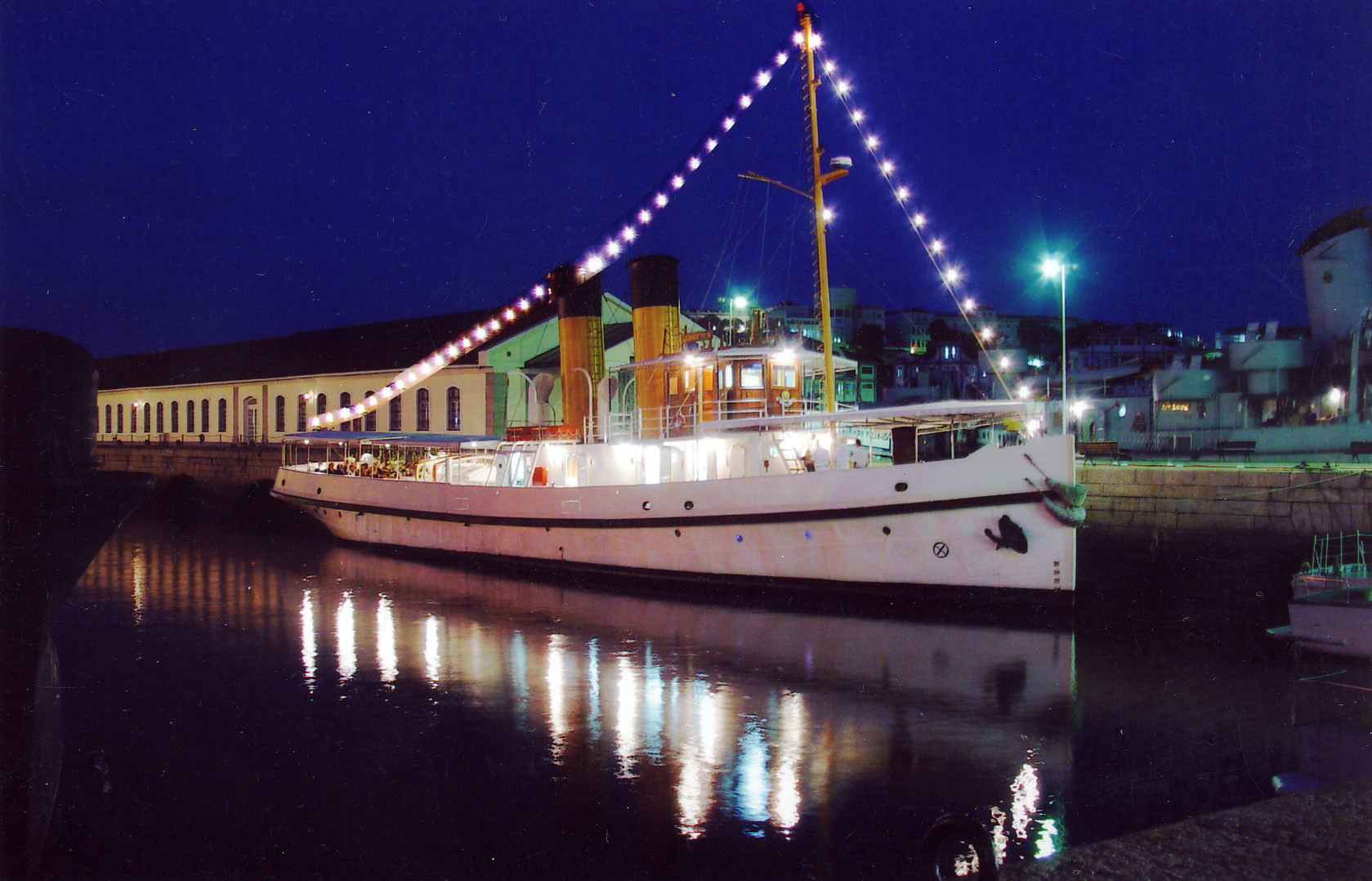
- Laurindo Pitta in 2009

History

Brazil
- Name: Laurindo Pitta
- Owner: Brazilian Navy
- Operator: Brazilian Navy
- Builder: Vickers, Sons & Maxim, Ltd, Barrow
- Launched: 20 August 1910
- Completed: 30 September 1910
- Decommissioned: 16 September 1959
- Status: Reactivated in 1998 as a museum ship

General characteristics
- Type: Tugboat
- Displacement: 514 t (506 long tons)
- Length: 39 m (128 ft)
- Beam: 8.0 m (26.2 ft)
- Draught: 4.5 m (14.8 ft)
- Speed: 11 knots (20 km/h; 13 mph)
- Armament: 2 × 47 mm (1.9 in) cannons

Laurindo Pitta is a museum ship and former tugboat of the Brazilian Navy, subordinated to the Directorate of Historical Heritage and Documentation of the Navy (DHHDN). She is the oldest vessel of the navy still in service, being built by the British shipyard Vickers, Sons & Maxim, Ltd, in 1910. The tugboat is 39 meters (127 ft 11 in) long and displaces 514 tonnes (506 long tons). She belonged to the Naval War Operations Division, part of the Brazilian squadron sent to patrol the northeastern African coast during World War I. In World War II, and participated in defending the port of Rio de Janeiro. Laurindo Pitta was decommissioned on 16 September 1959, but was still operated by the Brazilian Navy until the 1990s.

The Navy decided to restore her in 1998, and since then she has served the institution as a museum ship, subordinated to DHHDN. In this department, the boat is used in the Guanabara Bay tour and as a historical source for tourists who visit the Navy's Cultural Space, where she is stationed. Laurindo Pitta participated in naval events such as the celebration of the 500th anniversary of the discovery of Brazil, in 2000, and its centennial, in 2010, when the tugboat was presented with the title of Honorary Member of the North American Classic Yacht Association (CYA).

== History ==
=== Construction and features ===
At the beginning of the 20th century, the Brazilian government was studying plans for the modernization of its war navy, which, after the imperial period, was completely outdated. Two plans followed: Admiral Júlio César de Noronha's, in 1904, and Admiral Alexandrino Faria de Alencar's, in 1906. Although the first plan was approved by the legislative congress, with the change of government, the plan that materialized was the latter. The battleships Brazilian battleship Minas Geraes (2) and São Paulo were acquired in 1910; the cruisers Bahia and Rio Grande do Sul, as well as several other smaller ships, among them the tugboat Laurindo Pitta.

=== Service ===
Laurindo Pitta was the first vessel of the Brazilian fleet to bear this name, as she was a tribute to Laurindo Pitta de Castro, a deputy from the state of Rio de Janeiro, who died before seeing the finished fleet that he had heartedly defended. In 1913, the tugboat underwent two small repairs to clean and paint the bottom of the hull, one between 1–3 April, and another between 6–11 November. Due to the torpedoing of several Brazilian cargo ships by German submarines during the First World War, Brazil declared war on Germany. In 1918, the Naval Division in War Operations (NDWO) was created, a squadron composed of the cruisers Bahia and Rio Grande do Sul, the destroyers Piauí, Rio Grande do Norte, Parahyba and Santa Catarina, the auxiliary ship Belmonte and the tugboat Laurindo Pitta, armed with two 47-millimeter (1.9 in) cannons, which aimed to patrol the northeast African coast, from the city of Dakar to the Strait of Gibraltar.

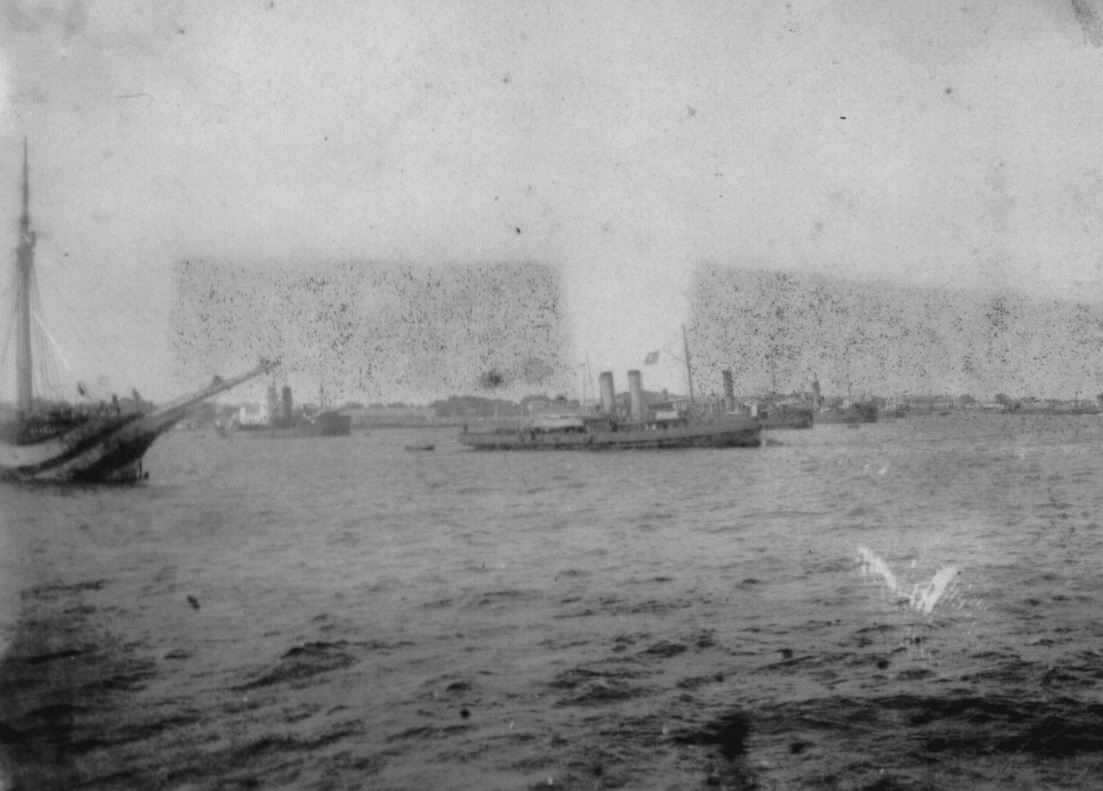
Picture of Laurindo Pitta likely from the First World War

The tugboat's trip took place on 8 April, with stops in Bahia and on the island of Fernando de Noronha. On the latter, the tugboat suspended all the days the division was there, between 24 April and 1 August, providing all the means for her proper operation, such as towing, mooring, and unmooring services, even during periods of intense sea agitation. The naval division left the island on 1 August toward the port of Freetown, Africa. During the journey, on 25 August, at 8:15 pm, Lieutenant Ernesto de Araújo, aboard the cruiser Rio Grande do Sul, saw a flash of light followed by a loud bang, which he thought was a cannon shot from one of the squadron's ships. Minutes later, the officer observed a straight line in the sea and soon concluded that it was a torpedo heading towards the stern of Belmonte, which was ahead of Laurindo Pitta. The crews of the tugboat and the other vessels of the division waited for the impact that did not occur, due to the deviation that the torpedo made before hitting the auxiliary ship, passing 20 meters (66 ft) away.

The division operated in those waters for the months of August, September, October, November, and December with very few losses among the convoys it protected. There were 57 convoys with 579 escorted ships and only 5 lost, meaning less than 1% of the total ships protected. No enemy vessels sunk by the division were credited. The most critical episode happened when the squadron mistook a pod of dolphins, which was crossing the division's route, for the sail of a German submarine, taking several shots at them, an event known as the "Battle of the Porpoises". The crew of the tugboat and other NDWO vessels were hit hard by the Spanish flu pandemic, which caused the death of numerous crew members. By 31 December, the entire squadron was anchored back at Rio de Janeiro. The NDWO was disbanded on 25 June 1919.

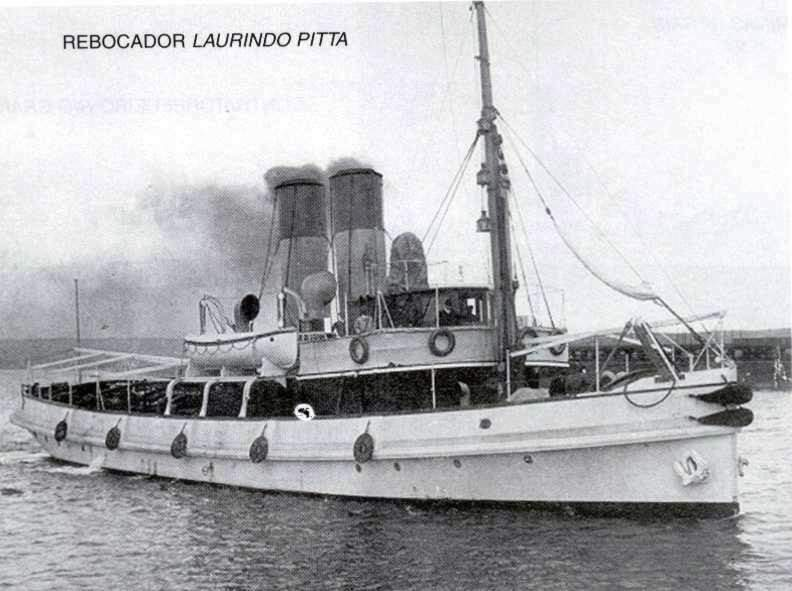
Laurindo Pitta at unknown date

On 22 February 1922, Laurindo Pitta helped the government of the liner Alagoas, used the day before as a target by the battleships São Paulo and Minas Geraes, even though it sank due to the poor condition of the ship. During the Second World War, the tugboat continued with towage services to help defend the port of Rio de Janeiro. After the war, she provided services to the Arsenal de Marinha do Rio de Janeiro and the Rio de Janeiro Naval Base. In 1948, she assisted the English ship Hopercrost, which was on fire about 100 miles (160 km) from the city of Cabo Frio. The tugboat continued in active service until her retirement on 16 September 1959. However, she remained in aid of the navy until 1997, when the vessel was already in a very poor state of repair.

=== Restoration ===
Due to the obsolescence of its machinery, Laurindo Pitta was moored at the wharf of Mocanguê Island, in Niterói. The vessel was considered to be permanently retired. However, a group called the League of Friends of the Naval Museum, linked to the Brazilian Navy, led a project to restore the tugboat, intending to turn her into a museum ship. The Navy decided to restore her and signed a contract with Estaleiro Itajaí S.A., based in Itajaí, in the state of Santa Catarina, on 16 April 1998. The contract provided for a duration of 11 months to complete the restoration, at a cost, at the time, of R$840,380.00.

Services included "structural repair; rebuilding of the gangway, chimneys, and mast; replacement of wood deck plating; replacement of main and power generation engines; overhaul and replacement of rudder engine system, auxiliary systems, salvage equipment, hull fittings; installation of seating for 90 passengers; refurbishment of canteen and awnings; sandblasting and painting," according to the boat's historical statement in a navy article. The restoration brought back the original external appearance from when she was commissioned in 1910 and the conversion of the vessel from a towboat to a museum ship. Inside, a compartment was adapted to house the permanent exhibition "The Navy's Participation in World War I". After restoration, Laurindo Pitta was subordinated to the Directorate of Historical Heritage and Documentation of the Navy, a department in 2020 under the command of Vice Admiral José Carlos Mathias and has remained in this institution since. She is the only remaining NDWO preserved Brazilian Navy vessel and the oldest still in active service.

=== Museum ship ===
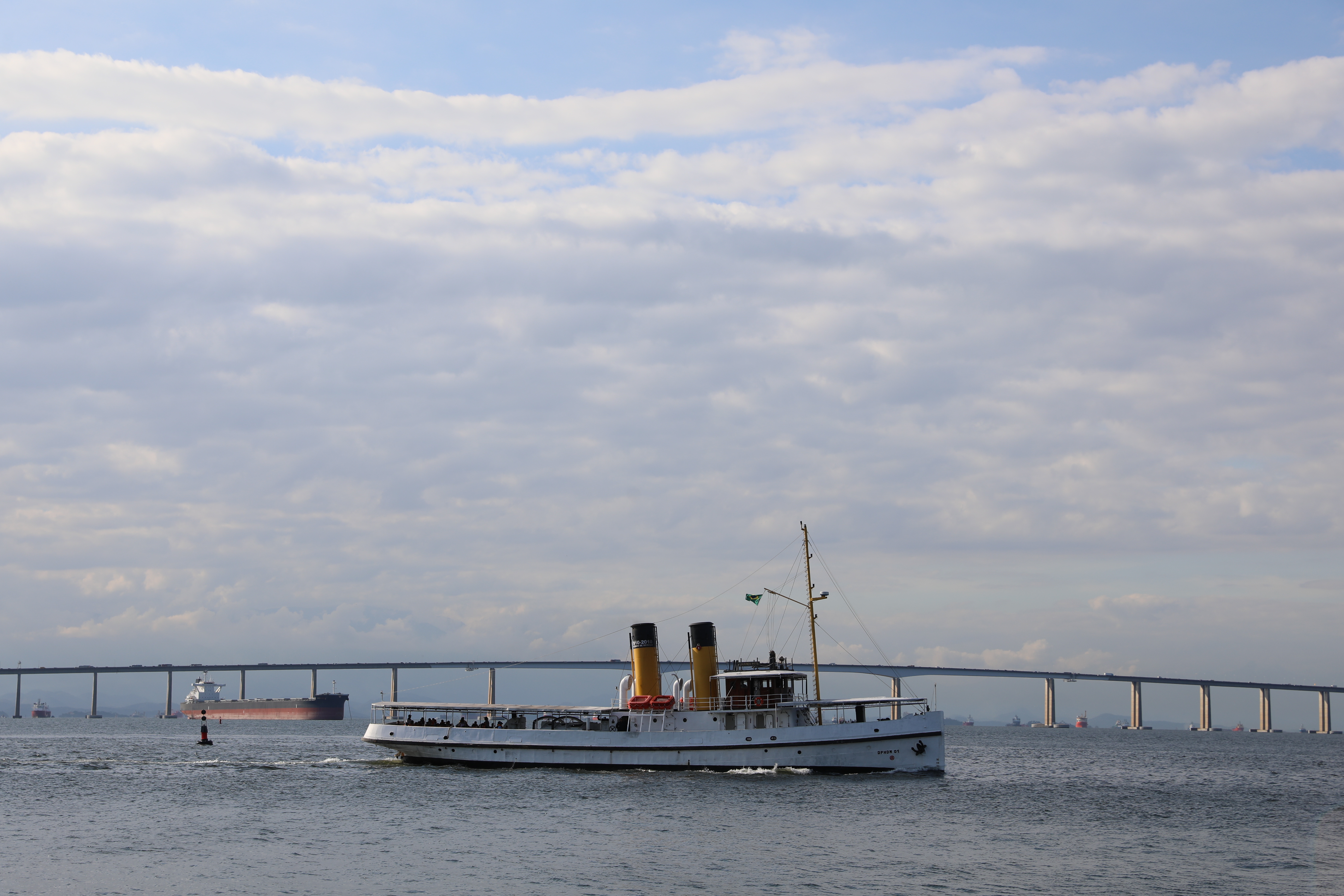
Laurindo Pitta during the ceremony of 76 years of the Directorate of Historical Heritage and Documentation of the Navy

Since the restoration, Laurindo Pitta returned to active service as a museum ship. Under the direction of DHHDN, the former tugboat has been used in tours around Guanabara Bay, taking tourists to historical sites and islands in the region. On 30 April 2000, Laurindo Pitta participated in the Navy's events to celebrate the 500th anniversary of the discovery of Brazil, together with several other warships from Brazil, South Africa, Argentina, Spain, the United States, the Netherlands, Poland, Portugal, the United Kingdom, Uruguay, and Venezuela. In celebration of her centennial, in 2010, the vessel was presented with the title of Honorary Member of the Classic Yacht Association (CYA), an association of North American enthusiasts interested in promoting and encouraging the restoration and preservation of antique ships. In the 2020s, the museum ship is one of the attractions of the Navy's Cultural Space, serving as a historical source and tour ship for tourists.

== See also ==
- Brazil during World War I
- List of ships of the Brazilian Navy
