= Brazil during World War I =

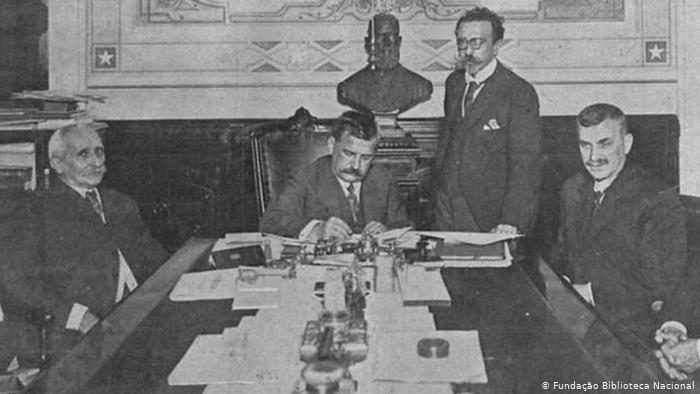
Brazilian president Venceslau Brás declares war on the Central Powers.

During World War I (1914–1918), Brazil initially adopted a neutral position in accordance with the Hague Convention as an attempt to maintain markets for its export products, mainly coffee, latex, and industrially manufactured items.

However, following the repeated sinking of Brazilian merchant ships by German submarines, President Venceslau Brás declared war against the Central Powers in 1917. Brazil then became the only country in South America to be directly involved in the war. Brazil's major contribution was the Brazilian Navy's patrol of areas in the Atlantic Ocean.

== Initial phase ==
Brazil officially declared neutrality on August 4, 1914. At the beginning of the war, although neutral, it faced a complicated social and economic situation. The Brazilian economy was largely based on exports of agricultural products such as coffee, latex, and very limited industrial manufacturing. As these products exported by Brazil were not considered essential by foreign governments or consumers, customs duties and export fees decreased as the conflict continued. This was worsened by the German blockade of Allied ports, as well as a British ban on the importation of coffee into England in 1917; the latter was introduced because the British government began prioritizing the shipping of more vital goods given the great losses of merchant ships as a result of German attacks.

On May 3, 1916, the Brazilian merchant ship Rio Branco was sunk by a German submarine, but this was in restricted waters, and the ship was registered under the British flag, with most of its crew composed of Norwegians. Therefore, the Brazilian government didn't consider it an illegal attack despite public uproar.

Relations between Brazil and the German Empire were shaken by the German decision to introduce unrestricted submarine warfare, thus allowing its submarines to sink any ship that breached the blockade. On April 5, 1917, the Brazilian steamship Paraná was torpedoed by a German submarine, which killed three Brazilians.

== Protests ==
When news of the sinking of the Paraná arrived in Brazil a few days later, several protests erupted in the capital. In Porto Alegre, initially, peaceful marches were organized with thousands of people. Later, however, demonstrators began attacking shops and properties owned by ethnic Germans or their descendants; examples were the Hotel Schmidt, the Germany Society, the club and the newspaper Deutsche Zeitung, and the Turnerbund. These and other establishments were raided, looted, and torched. On November 1, 1917, an enraged mob damaged houses, clubs, and factories in Petropolis, including the restaurant Brahma (which was completely destroyed), the Gesellschaft Germania, the German school, the Arp company, and the German Journal, among others. At the same time, there were minor demonstrations in other cities. Such violence continued until Brazil declared war against Germany and its allies in October 1917. (Additionally, the Minister of Foreign Relations Lauro Müller, a citizen of German origin with a pro-neutrality position, was forced to resign.)

Although nationalist and pro-war demonstrations intensified over 1917, they never surpassed the anti-war and anti-militarist demonstrations led by trade unionists, anarchists and pacifists which opposed the war and accused the government of diverting attention from internal problems, sometimes coming into conflict with the very nationalist groups that supported Brazil's active participation in the war. Violent repression followed a general strike late in 1917, and the declaration of war in October also served as a means to declare a state of emergency and persecute opponents.

=== Diplomatic consequences ===
- April 11, 1917: Brazil broke diplomatic relations with Germany
- May 20, 1917: the U-boat UC-36 torpedoed the steamship Tijuca near the French coast; in the following months, the Brazilian government seized 42 German merchant ships in Brazilian ports
- May 22, 1917: U-47 torpedoed the steamship Lapa.
- October 18, 1917: U-93 torpedoed the steamship Macau near the coast of Spain and took the captain prisoner
- October 26, 1917: Brazil declared war on the Central Powers with limited popular support
- November 2, 1917: U-151 torpedoed the steamships Acari and Guaíba

== Military involvement ==
Brazilian cavalrymen, First World War

=== Calógeras Plan ===
The administration of Venceslau Brás, which was in its last year in office, made statements implying that it did not intend to involve the country deeper into the conflict. Nevertheless, in early 1918, a confidential report commissioned by the presidential candidate elected that year, Rodrigues Alves, was completed. This report, regarding the entry of Brazil into the conflict, was coordinated by the parliamentary expert on foreign policy and military affairs, João Pandiá Calógeras. Dubbed the Calógeras Plan, it recommended that the country send an expeditionary force of considerable size to fight in the war. It also advised using all necessary means (including ships of enemy powers already seized in Brazilian waters and ports) to disembark the troops on French soil where they would be trained and equipped by the French—all was to be financed with U.S. bank loans which in turn would be settled by compensation imposed on the defeated enemies after the war.

The Calógeras Plan (which was only made public after the death of its authors) contained several proposals, intended for the newly elected administration taking office in November of that year, across several government areas. However, the international and domestic events that year, as well as the specific circumstances of Brazilian politics (with a notable opposition to war in the population) and the country's unclear foreign policy, ultimately prevented it from being carried forward, precluding the country from greater involvement in the conflict.

=== Army ===
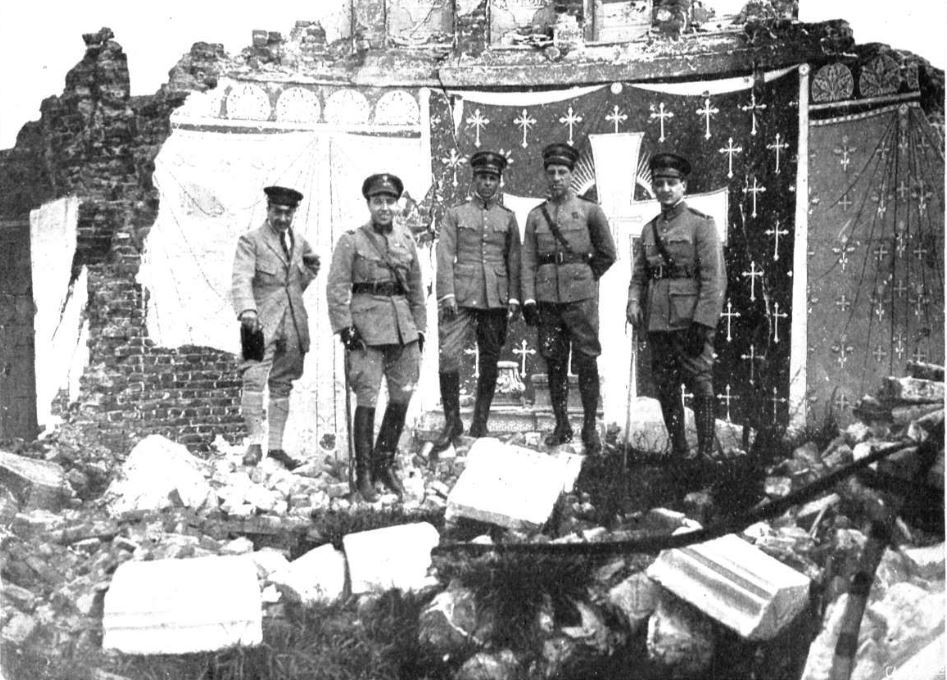
Brazilian soldiers visiting the frontline in Aisne.

The Brazilian Army was enlarged to 54,000 men following the declaration of war, but this rapid expansion meant that most immediately available resources had to be directed to the training and equipping of new recruits. Brazil's direct participation in land operations was limited to a preparatory military mission of 24 officers and sergeants sent to Europe in mid-1918. Its members were attached to allied units, mainly in the French Army, to gain awareness of modern techniques employed in organization and combat on the Western Front.

One-third of the officers who were sent to France were promoted for their courage in battle. Among them were José Pessoa, who was a lieutenant at the time. Throughout his career, he became an important ideologue and reformer of the Brazilian Army. Also promoted was Major Tertuliano Potiguara, a controversial figure accused of war crimes in the Contestado campaign, who was wounded in action at the Battle of St. Quentin Canal during the Meuse-Argonne Offensive.

The end of World War I in November 1918 precluded the further development of the country's military involvement in the war as envisioned in the Calógeras Plan.

=== Navy ===
Brazil's main military involvement in World War I took place at sea. In particular, the Secretary of the Navy ordered the use of naval power in the anti-submarine campaign, with Admiral Alexandre Faria de Alencar organizing a task force that would allow the effective participation of the Brazilian Navy in World War I. Ministerial Notice No. 501 was issued on January 30, 1918, thus establishing the Naval Division for War Operations (Divisão Naval em Operações de Guerra, or DNOG), a naval fleet composed of units drawn from the fleets that formed the Navy in Brazil. The dreadnoughts Minas Geraes and São Paulo, as well as the Bahia and Rio Grande do Sul, were some of the major warships of the DNOG.

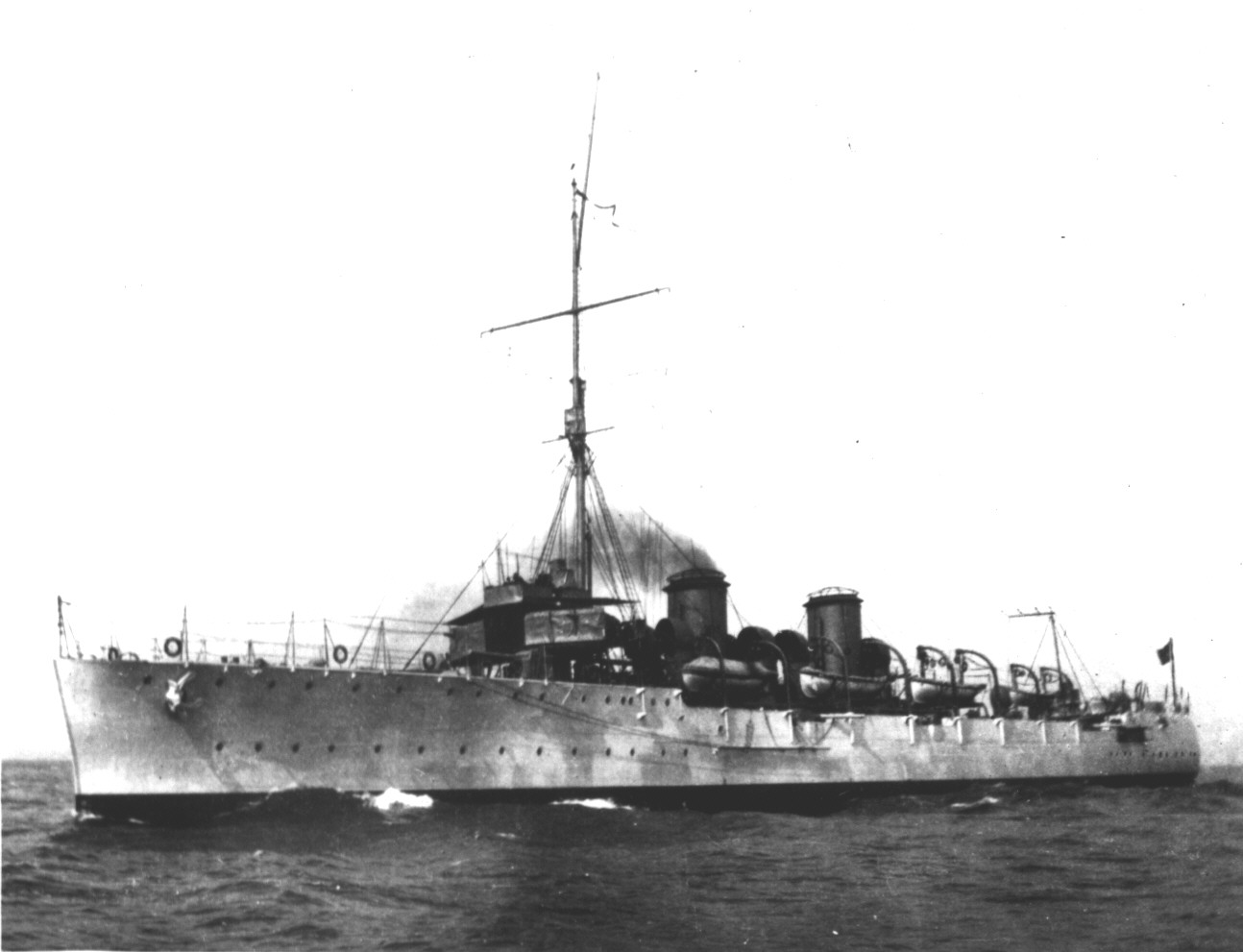
Cruiser Bahia

The DNOG comprised the following vessels:

- Scout cruiser Rio Grande do Sul
- Scout cruiser Bahia
- Destroyer Piauí (CT–3)
- Destroyer Rio Grande do Norte (CT–4)
- Destroyer Paraíba (CT–5)
- Destroyer Santa Catarina (CT–9)
- Tender Belmonte auxiliary ship
- Laurindo Pitta fleet tug

The DNOG was initially tasked to patrol the Atlantic maritime area covered by the triangle between the city of Dakar on the African coast, the island of São Vicente, Cape Verde, and Gibraltar at the entrance to the Mediterranean. The Division would remain under the orders of the British Admiralty, represented by Admiral Hischcot Grant. As Commander, the Minister appointed one of the most well-regarded officers at the time, Admiral Pedro de Frontin, on January 30, 1918.

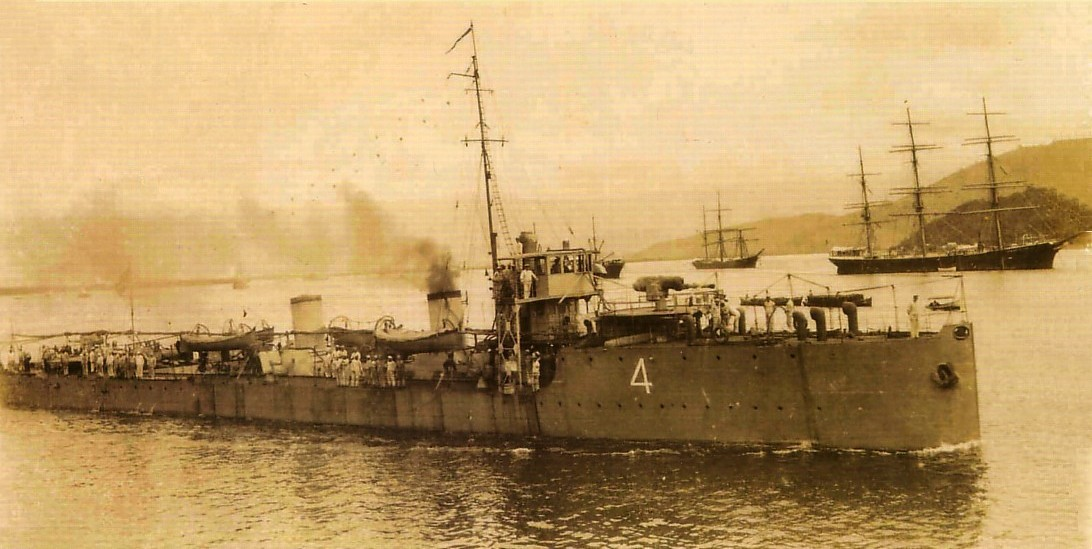
Destroyer Rio Grande do Norte

The war at sea fought by Brazil's navy began on August 1, 1918, following the departure of the force from the port of Rio de Janeiro. On August 3, 1918, the German submarine U-43 torpedoed the Brazilian ship Maceió. On August 9, 1918, the mission reached Freetown in Sierra Leone, with the fleet staying 14 days, during which the crew began falling ill with Spanish flu during a pandemic.

On the night of August 25, while sailing from Freetown to Dakar, the division suffered a torpedo attack by German submarines, but no casualties or damage were suffered by the Brazilian vessels; the torpedoes passed harmlessly between the Brazilian ships. A successful counter-attack using depth charges was launched, and the Royal Navy credited the Brazilians with the destruction of a U-boat. Subsequently, after anchoring in the port of Dakar, the crews were again severely hit by the Spanish flu, which claimed the lives of over a hundred sailors and kept the Division restricted to port for almost two months.

Among the Allied naval command, there was debate about how the forces of the Brazilian fleet should be used: "The Italians wanted them in the Mediterranean, the Americans wanted them to work closely with US forces, and the French wanted to keep them protecting the commercial maritime traffic along the African coast Between Dakar and Gibraltar". This indecision among the Allied command, combined with operational problems and the Spanish flu pandemic, led to extended delays. In effect, the fleet didn't arrive at Gibraltar until the beginning of November 1918, just days before the signing of the armistice and the end of the war.

As another preparatory military mission, the navy sent a group of military aviators who served with the Royal Air Force on the western front.

=== Military medical mission ===
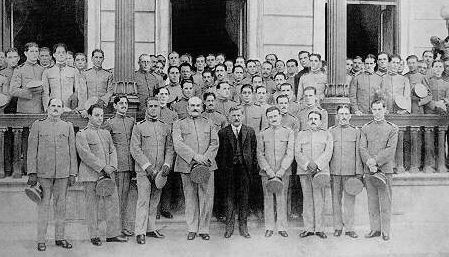
First World War, Brazilian Medical Mission.

On August 18, 1918, the Brazilian Medical Mission, led by Dr. Nabuco Gouveia and directed by General Aché, was established with 86 doctors, civilian pharmacists, administrative support staff, and a security platoon. They were sent to the European Theatre to establish a hospital.

On September 24, 1918, the Mission landed at the French port of Marseille. The hospital was opened in Paris, but the main roles performed by the Medical Mission were in providing treatment for French sufferers during the Spanish flu epidemic and in ensuring the continuity of logistical support to the troops at the front. The Medical Mission was terminated in February 1919.

== Aftermath ==
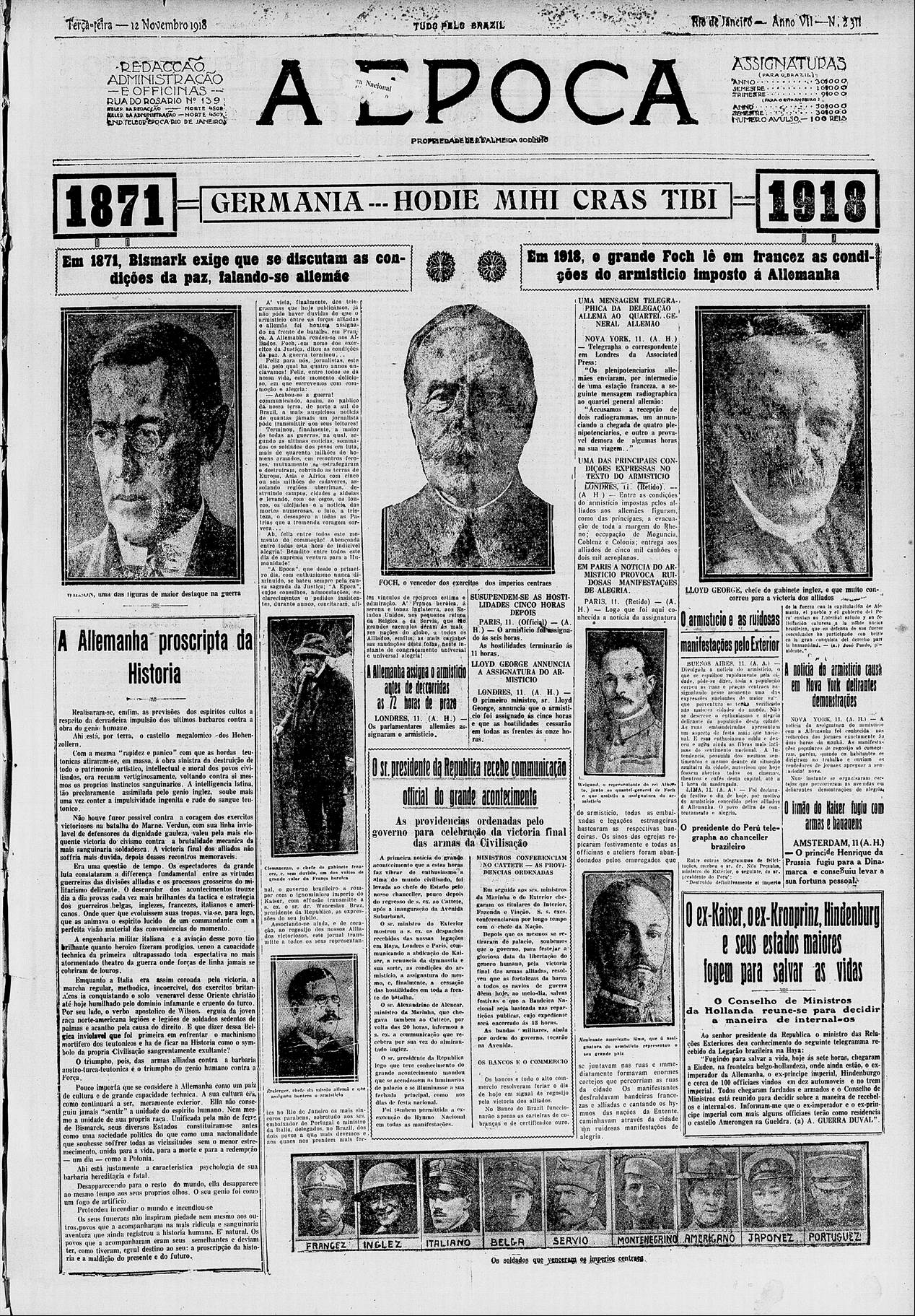
Brazilian journal A Época highlighting the end of the war with the signing of the Armistice of Compiègne on November 12, 1918.

After the war's end, Brazil participated in the Versailles Peace Conference with a delegation led by Epitácio Pessoa, Brazil's future president. Brazil was also a founder of the League of Nations after the end of the war.

Upon returning to Brazil, the Naval Division (DNOG) was dissolved on June 25, 1919, having complied fully with its entrusted mission. The Treaty of Versailles allowed Brazil to keep over 70 ships that it had seized from the Central Powers during the war, which were then incorporated into the Brazilian merchant fleet. Brazil was also financially compensated by Germany for the lost coffee shipments and ships that were sunk by German U-boats during the war.

From an economic point of view, although exports of latex and coffee initially fell sharply and created a crisis in the economy as the conflict continued, Brazil eventually began to find good trading opportunities. Increased international demand for foodstuffs and raw materials forced the country to change its economic structure away from predominant agriculture. It was during this time that Brazil underwent unprecedented industrial development, also making use of immigrant labor primarily composed of Europeans initially fleeing famine and then the war. The number of factories quadrupled in the war years, doubling the number of workers, and Brazil reduced its number of imported items, leading to a transformation in the country's socioeconomic landscape.

== See also ==
- Brazil in World War II
- Brazilian Expeditionary Force
- South American dreadnought race

== Bibliography ==
- Donato, Hernâni, 1987 Dicionário das Batalhas Brasileiras ("Dictionary of Brazilian Battles") (in Portuguese) IBRASA, 1987 ISBN 8534800340
- Faria, Ivan Rodrigues de, 1996 Participação do Brasil na Primeira Guerra Mundial (in Portuguese) ('Brazil's participation in World War I') Brazilian Army Journal, Rio – DPHCEx, (p. 67)
- Frota, Guilherme de Andrea, 2000 500 Anos de História do Brasil (in Portuguese) Brazilian Army Press, ISBN 8570112777
- Halpern, Paul G, 1994, A naval history of World War I, US Naval Institute, ISBN 9780870212666 (hc)
- Horne, Charles F, 1923, Records of the Great War, Volume V, National Alumni
- Maia, Prado, 1961, D.N.O.G. (Divisão Naval em Operações de Guerra), 1914–1918: uma página esquecida da história da Marinha Brasileira (in Portuguese) ('DNOG – Naval Fleet in War Operations, 1914–1918: A forgotten page of Brazilian Navy History') (Brazilian) Navy General Documentation Service, OCLC 22210405
- McCann, Frank D, 2004 Soldiers of the Patria, A History of the Brazilian Army, 1889–1937, Stanford University Press, ISBN 0804732221
- Scheina, Robert L, 2003, Latin America's Wars Volume II: The Age of the Professional Soldier, 1900–2001 Potomac Books, Chapter 5. ISBN 1574884522
- Compagnon, Olivier, 2014, O Adeus à Europa. A América Latina e a Grande Guerra (Argentina e Brasil, 1914–1939), Rio de Janeiro, Editora Rocco, ISBN 9788532529275
