= Bahia-class cruiser =

Brazilian scout cruiser class (1910–1948)

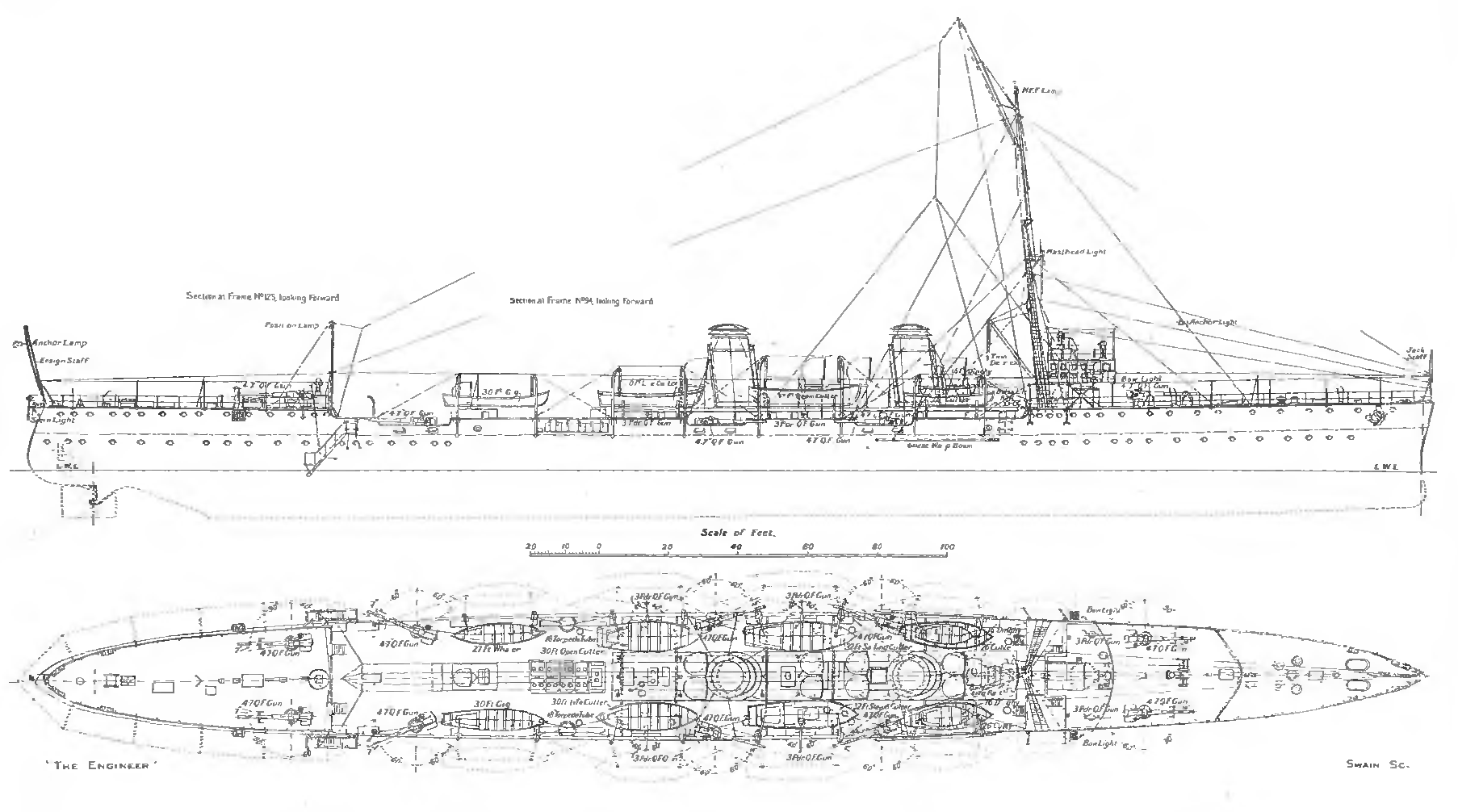
- Line drawings of the Bahia class

Class overview
- Name: Bahia class
- Operators: Brazilian Navy
- Built: 1907–1910
- In commission: 1910–1948
- Planned: 3
- Completed: 2
- Canceled: 1
- Lost: 1
- Scrapped: 1

General characteristics
- Type: Scout cruiser
- Displacement: 3,100 t (3,100 long tons)
- Length: 122.38 m (401 ft 6 in) oa; 115.82 m (380.0 ft) pp
- Beam: 11.89–11.91 m (39 ft 0 in – 39 ft 1 in)
- Draft: 3.81 m (12 ft 6 in) forward; 4.75 m (15.6 ft) amidships; 4.42 m (14.5 ft) aft
- Propulsion: Five Parsons steam turbines, ten Yarrow boilers; Coal normal 150 t (150 long tons; 170 short tons); Maximum 650 t (640 long tons; 720 short tons)
- Speed: 26.5 knots (49.1 km/h; 30.5 mph) as designed; 27.016 knots (50.034 km/h; 31.089 mph) trial; 25 knots (46 km/h; 29 mph) at full load
- Endurance: 1,400 nmi (2,600 km; 1,600 mi) at 23.5 knots (43.5 km/h; 27.0 mph); 3,500 nmi (6,500 km; 4,000 mi) at 10 knots (19 km/h; 12 mph)
- Complement: 320 to 357
- Armament: ten × 120 mm (4.7 in)/50 caliber, six × 47 mm (1.9 in)/50 caliber, two × 457 mm (18.0 in) torpedo tubes
- Armor: Deck: 19 mm (0.75 in); Conning tower: 76 mm (3.0 in)
- Notes: These specifications apply to when Bahia was commissioned.

The Bahia class was a pair of scout cruisers built for Brazil by Armstrong Whitworth in the United Kingdom, based on a design that borrowed heavily from the British Adventure-class scout cruisers. The class comprised the lead ship Bahia and her sister Rio Grande do Sul, along with a canceled third ship, Ceara. Both were named after states of Brazil. As a class, they were the fastest cruisers in the world when commissioned, and the first in the Brazilian Navy to use steam turbines for propulsion.

In the mid-1920s, both ships were extensively modernized with three new Brown–Curtis turbine engines and six new Thornycroft boilers, and, in the process, was converted from coal-burning ships to oil-burning. The refit resulted in a striking aesthetic change, with the exhaust being trunked into three funnels, instead of two. The armament was also modified; three 20.1 mm (0.79 in) Madsen guns, a 7 mm (0.28 in) Hotchkiss machine gun, and four 533 mm (21.0 in) torpedo tubes were added.

In the Second World War, both were used as convoy escorts. On 4 July 1945, Bahia was lost after an accident caused a massive explosion which incapacitated the ship and sunk her within minutes, resulting a large loss of life. Rio Grande do Sul survived the war and was scrapped in 1948.

== Design ==
The class's design borrowed heavily from the British Adventure-class scout cruisers. The ships displaced 3,100 tonnes (3,100 long tons), and their dimensions were 122.38 m (401 ft 6 in) overall, 115.82 m (380 ft 0 in) between perpendiculars, 11.89–11.91 m (39 ft 0 in – 39 ft 1 in) at the beam, and a draft of 3.81 m (12 ft 6 in) forward, 4.75 m (15 ft 7 in) amidships, and 4.42 m (14 ft 6 in) aft. They were powered by five Parsons steam turbines, and ten Yarrow boilers, with a coal bunker that could hold a normal load of 150 t (150 long tons), and a maximum load of 650 t (640 long tons).

The Bahia class was designed to reach a speed of 26.5 knots (49.1 km/h; 30.5 mph); both ships exceeded this during trials with Bahia reaching 27.016 knots (50.034 km/h) at trial. As designed, the class's range was 1,400 nautical miles (2,600 km; 1,600 mi) at 23.5 knots (43.5 km/h; 27.0 mph), or 3,500 nautical miles (6,500 km; 4,000 mi) at 10 knots (19 km/h; 12 mph). The class was armed with ten 120 mm (4.7 in)/50 caliber, six QF 3 pounder 47 mm (1.9 in)/50 caliber guns and two 457 mm (18.0 in) torpedo tubes. The class was lightly armored with only 19 mm (0.75 in) of deck armor, with the conning tower having 76 mm (3.0 in). Vickers would later pitch the Bahia design to the Ottoman Navy in 1912, but nothing came of it prior to the outbreak of the First World War.

== Construction ==
The class was part of a large 1904 naval building program by Brazil. Also planned as part of this were the two Minas Geraes-class dreadnoughts, ten Pará-class destroyers, three submarines and a submarine tender. With a design that borrowed heavily from the British Adventure-class scout cruisers, Bahia's keel was laid first on 19 August 1907 in Armstrong Whitworth's Elswick, Newcastle upon Tyne yard, followed by Rio Grande do Sul 30 August 1907. Construction took about a year and a half, and both ships were launched in 1909. (Note: The Miramar Ship Index—using information from contemporary builders' records—and Poder Naval Online record Bahia's launching date as 20 January 1909, and her sister ship Rio Grande do Sul's as 20 April 1909. Conway's All the World's Fighting Ships 1906–1921 and the Brazilian Navy's official history reverse these dates, giving 20 January for Rio Grande do Sul and 20 April for Bahia. This article uses the former date because of Miramar's use of builders' records, which, in this case, should be the most accurate source. See: "Bahia (6103832)". Miramar Ship Index.; "Rio Grande do Sul (6103914)". Miramar Ship Index.; Gardiner and Gray eds. (1985), p. 405; "Bahia (3º)". Histórico de Navios On-Line (in Portuguese). Marinha do Brasil. Archived from the original on 12 August 2011.) Both ships were completed and commissioned into the navy in 1910. As a class, Bahia and Rio Grande do Sul were the fastest cruisers in the world when they were commissioned, and the first in the Brazilian Navy to utilize steam turbines for propulsion.

== Modernization ==
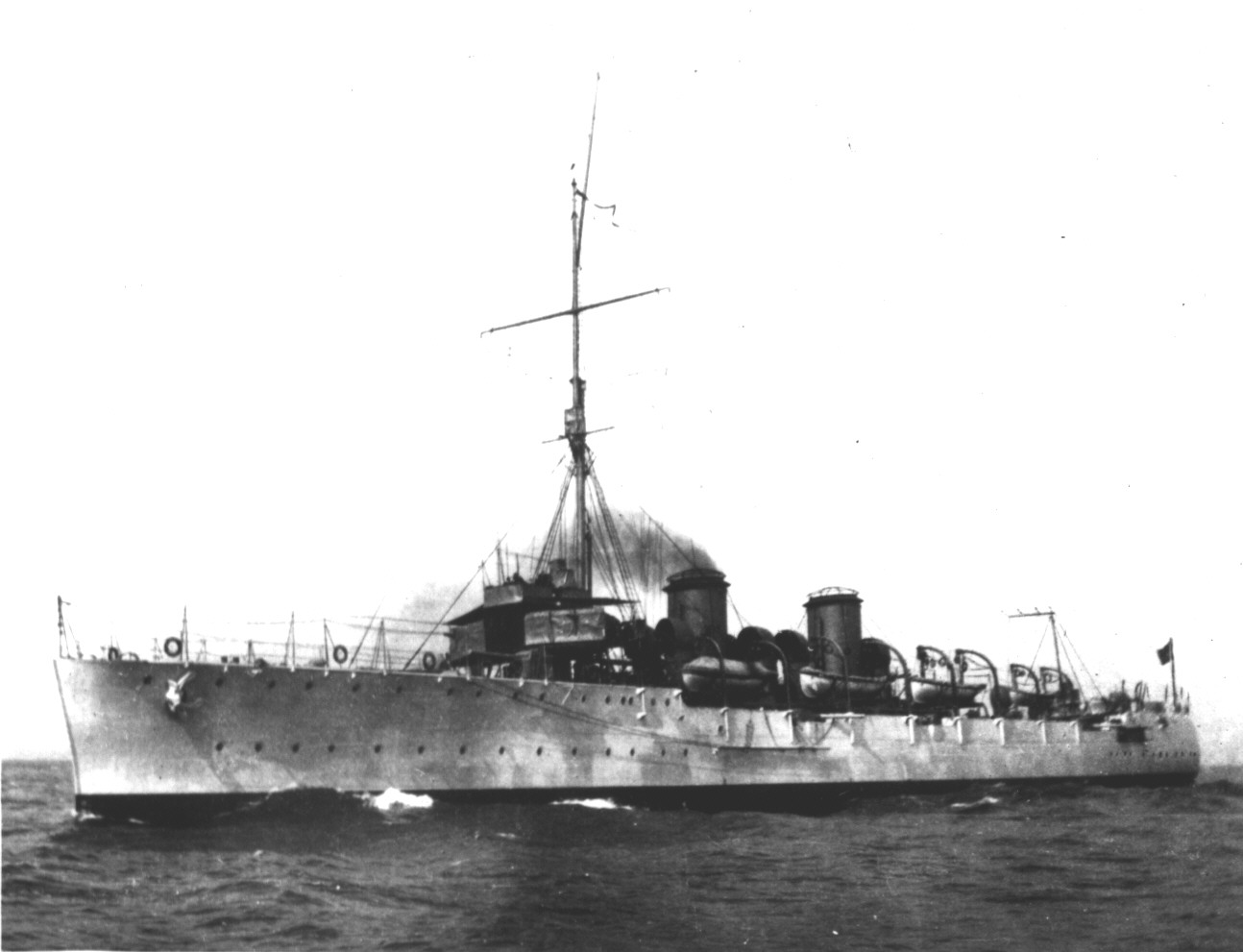
Bahia prior to being modernized between 1925 and 26, with a low bridge and two funnels.

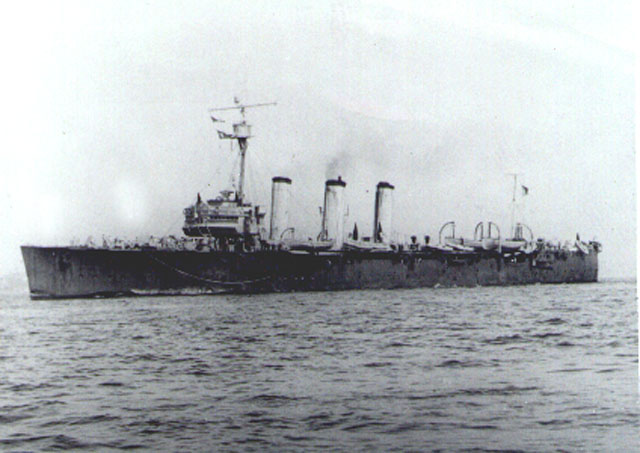
Bahia post-modernization. The most striking visual changes were adding height to and adding a third funnel. Even though oil has a greater thermal efficiency, an extra funnel was necessitated by the arrangement of new oil-firing boilers, where two each were placed in three independent compartments.

In the mid-1920s, (Note: The official history of the ship gives a 1924–1927 range, while Conway's All The World's Fighting Ship's 1906–1921 p. 405 and Poder Naval Online give 1925–1926.) the class underwent significant modernization. The original five turbines were replaced by three Brown–Curtiss turbines, while the original ten boilers were replaced by six Thornycroft oil-burning boilers, which necessitated the addition of a third funnel. The former coal bunkers, along with some of the space freed up by the decrease in boilers, were converted to hold 588,120 L (155,360 US gal) of oil. These changes resulted in Bahia's top speed increasing to 28 knots (52 km/h; 32 mph). All of the boats on board were replaced, and three 20.1 mm (0.79 in) Madsen guns, a 7 mm (0.28 in) Hotchkiss machine gun, and four 533 mm (21.0 in) torpedo tubes were added to give the ship a defense against aircraft and more power against surface ships.

The class was modernized again twice during the Second World War, in both 1942 and 1944. The modernizations were not as extensively as it was in the 1920s; the Brazilian Navy's official history of Bahia reports these but does not specify what modifications the ship underwent in which year. Two 47 mm (1.9 in) guns were replaced with 76 mm (3.0 in) L/23 AA guns, Madsen guns were replaced with seven Oerlikon 20 mm cannons in single mounts, and a director for these guns was installed. Two depth charge tracks were added, improved range-finders were added to the 120 mm (4.7 in) guns, and sonar and radar were fitted, in addition to other minor modifications. (Note: Regarding the installation of sonar, it is not clear whether it was fitted for the first time in 1942 (and used in the 10 July depth charging) or whether a more modern sonar replaced an outmoded version in either 1942 or 1944.)

== Loss of Bahia ==
On 4 July 1945, Bahia was acting as a plane guard for transport aircraft flying from the Atlantic to Pacific theaters of war. While Bahia's gunners were firing at a kite for anti-aircraft practice, one fired too low and hit depth charges stored near the stern of the ship. A massive explosion incapacitated the ship and sank her within minutes, resulting a large loss of life.

== See also ==
- List of historical ships of the Brazilian Navy
