= Brazilian ship Piauí =

At least two ships of the Brazilian Navy have borne the name Piauí

- Brazilian monitor Piauí, a Pará-class monitor launched in 1868 and scrapped in 1893
- Brazilian destroyer Piauí (1908), a Pará-class destroyer launched in 1908 and stricken in 1944
- Brazilian destroyer Piauí (1967) (pennant number D31), a Pará-class destroyer; the former American Fletcher class USS Lewis Hancock (DD-675); acquired by the Brazilian Navy in 1967; scrapped in 1989
