= Ludington Daily News =

Newspaper in Ludington, Michigan

- Front page for April 30, 2013
- Type: Daily newspaper
- Format: Broadsheet
- Owner: Shoreline Media (Community Media Group)
- Publisher: Mike Hrycko
- Editor: David Bossick
- Founded: 1867
- Headquarters: 202 N. Rath Avenue, Ludington, Michigan 49431; United States
- Circulation: 4,090 (as of 2022)
- OCLC number: 27033604
- Website: ludingtondailynews.com

The Ludington Daily News is the daily newspaper of Ludington, Michigan. The paper traces its origins back to September 17, 1867, the date of the first issue of the predecessor Mason County Record. The first issue of the Ludington Daily Sun was published on April 5, 1901, and the paper was renamed the Ludington Daily News in 1906. It is owned by Shoreline Media, which has been a subsidiary of Community Media Group since January 1, 2012.
