= Brazilian cruiser Rio Grande do Sul =

Bahia-class cruiser built for the Brazilian Navy

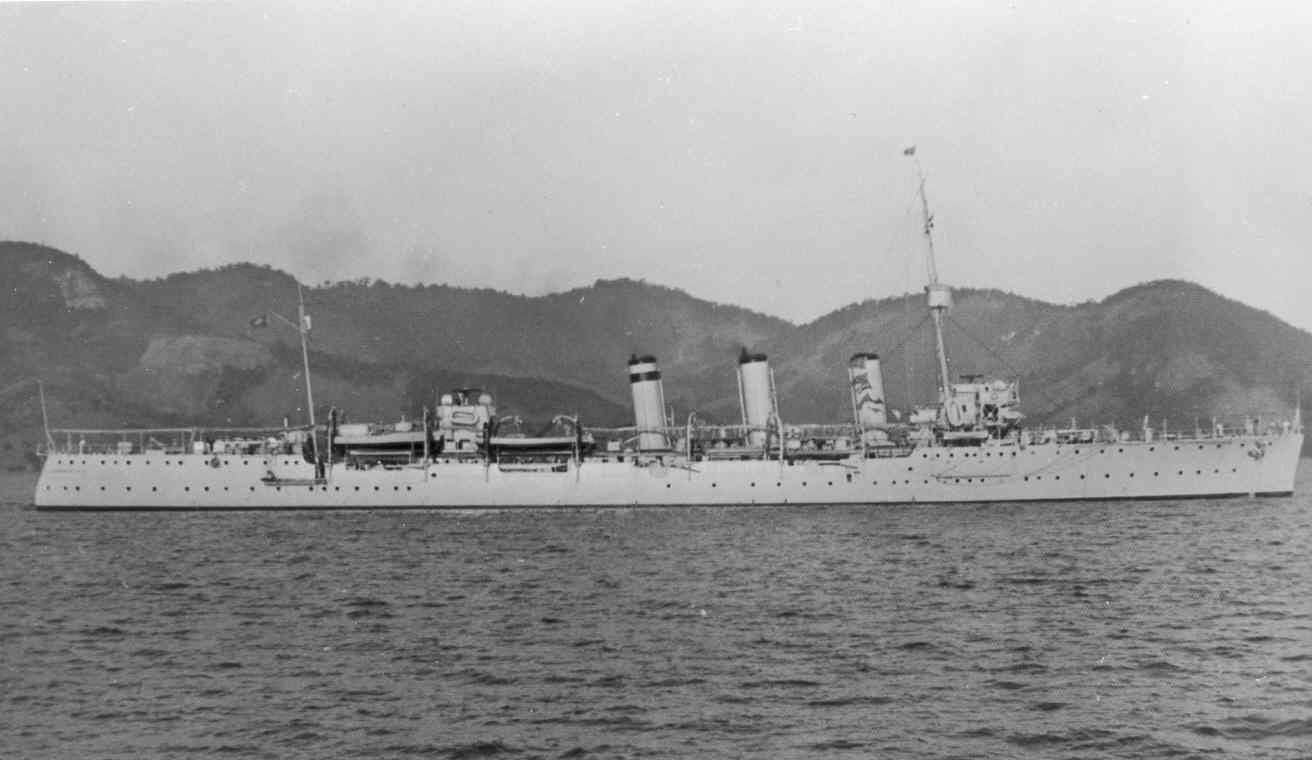
- Rio Grande do Sul sometime after its mid-1920s modernization, as indicated by the third funnel.

History

Brazil
- Name: Rio Grande do Sul
- Namesake: The Brazilian state of Rio Grande do Sul
- Builder: Armstrong Whitworth
- Yard number: 810
- Laid down: 30 August 1907
- Launched: 20 April 1909
- Commissioned: 14 May 1910
- Decommissioned: 1948
- Fate: Scrapped

General characteristics
- Class & type: Bahia-class cruiser
- Displacement: 3,100 tonnes (3,050 long tons; 3,420 short tons)
- Length: 122.38 m (401.5 ft) oa; 115.82 m (380.0 ft) pp
- Beam: 11.89–11.91 m (39.0–39.1 ft)
- Draft: 3.81 m (12.5 ft) forward; 4.75 m (15.6 ft) amidships; 4.42 m (14.5 ft) aft
- Propulsion: Five Parsons steam turbines, ten Yarrow boilers; Coal normal 150 t (148 long tons; 165 short tons); Maximum 650 t (640 long tons; 717 short tons)
- Speed: 27.016 knots (50.034 km/h; 31.089 mph) trial; 25 knots (46 km/h; 29 mph) at full load
- Endurance: 1,400 nautical miles (2,600 km; 1,600 mi) at 23.5 knots (43.5 km/h; 27.0 mph); 3,500 nautical miles (6,500 km; 4,000 mi) at 10 knots (19 km/h; 12 mph)
- Complement: 320 to 357
- Armament: ten × 120 mm (4.724 in)/50 caliber, six × 3 pdr 47 mm (1.85 in)/50 caliber, two × 457 mm (18.0 in) torpedo tubes
- Armor: Deck: 19 mm (0.748 in); Conning tower: 76 mm (2.992 in)
- Notes: Specifications given are prior to the 1925–26 modernization.

Rio Grande do Sul was a Bahia-class cruiser built for the Brazilian Navy in 1909–10.

== Construction and commissioning ==
Rio Grande do Sul was part of a large 1904 naval building program by Brazil. Also planned as part of this were the two Minas Geraes-class dreadnoughts, ten Pará-class destroyers, three submarines and a submarine tender. With a design that borrowed heavily from the British Adventure-class scout cruisers, Rio Grande do Sul's keel was laid in 1907 in Armstrong Whitworth's Elswick, Newcastle upon Tyne yard. Construction took about a year and a half, and she was launched on 20 April 1909 with Madame A. M. Gomez Ferraz being the sponsor on behalf of Her Excellency Senhora Dr. Carlos Barbosa. As a class, Bahia and Rio Grande do Sul were the fastest cruisers in the world when they were commissioned, and the first in the Brazilian Navy to utilize steam turbines for propulsion.

== Gallery ==
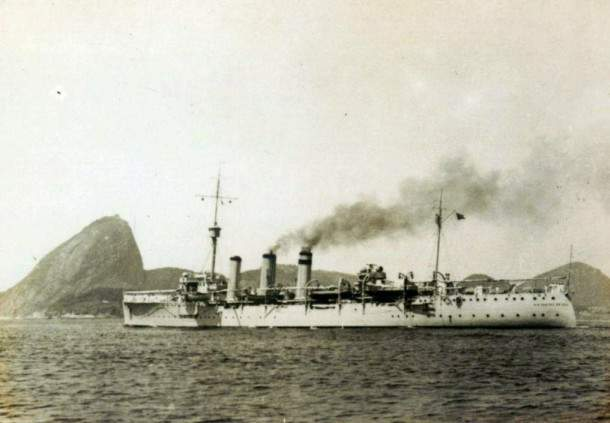

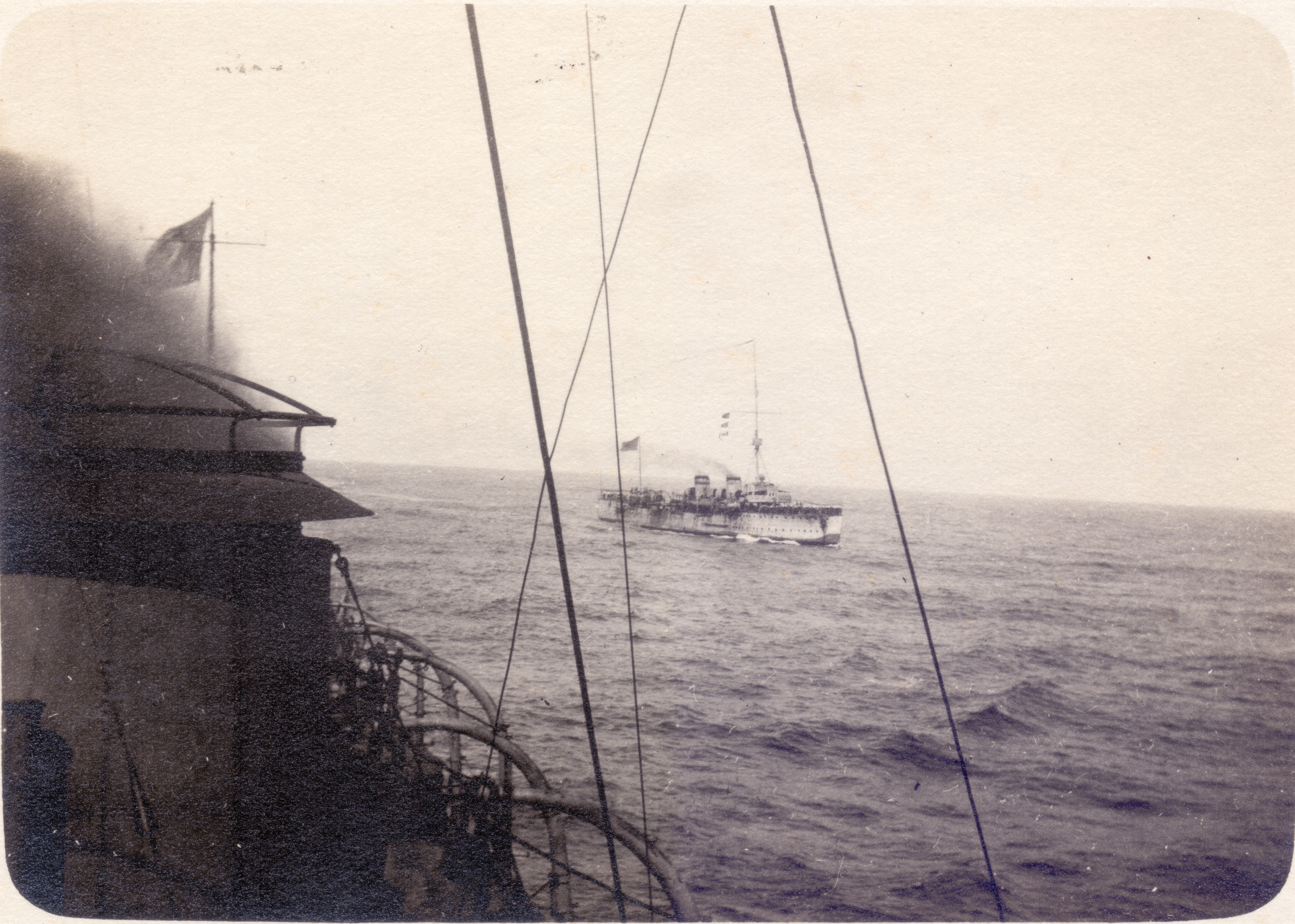

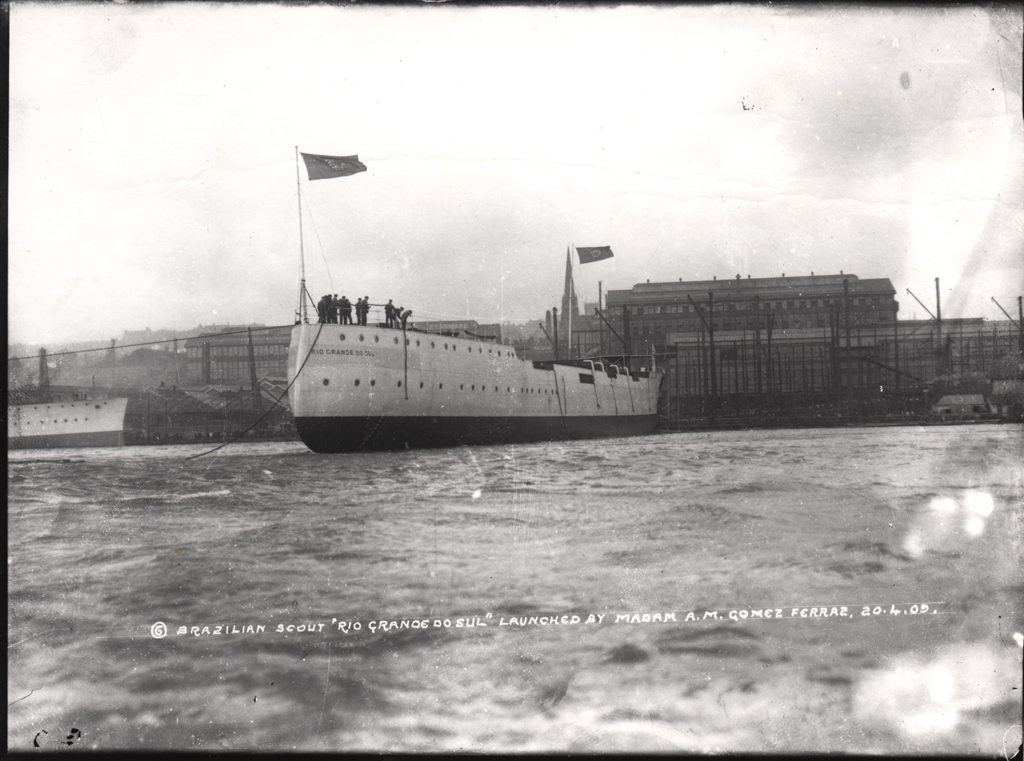

== See also ==
- List of historical ships of the Brazilian Navy
