= Legacy of Pedro II of Brazil =

Impact of the second Emperor of Brazil

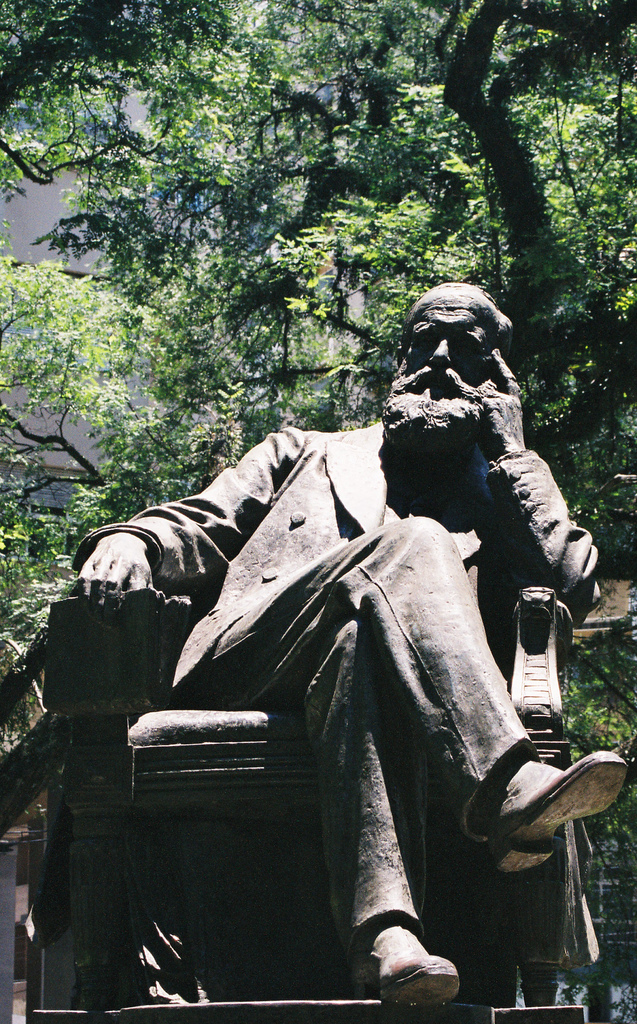
In Brazil, Emperor Pedro II has been memorialised as a wise, benevolent, austere and honest fatherlike figure.

The legacy of Pedro II of Brazil became apparent soon after his death. Emperor Pedro II was the second and last monarch of the Empire of Brazil, whose long 58-year reign (1831–1889) represented a time of remarkable prosperity and progress for his country. Despite his achievements, he was deposed in a coup by disgruntled republicans, though there was no desire for a change in the form of government among the majority of the Brazilian people.

His popularity among the citizenry had never waned, and support continued to be evident, even on the eve of his overthrow and throughout his exile. He was seen as a hero, a model citizen, a caring monarch, and the source of national unity and well-being. Following his death, political wrangling prevented the return of his remains to Brazil. Continued efforts to repatriate the bodies of the Emperor and his wife dragged on for decades. The disputes were resolved and this was finally accomplished in 1920 with much fanfare. Over the decades, Pedro II gradually grew within Brazil to represent the archetypical benevolent, self-effacing and effective ruler concerned only for the national welfare.

Aside from the prosperity and modernization Pedro II left to the nation, there was also a heritage of political and personal values. Many of his reforms and achievements had become so much a part of the national consciousness that they were accommodated by successor regimes. These formed the foundation for Brazilian democratic ideals. Historians have also largely agreed that Pedro II's reign was not merely benign, but rather, exceptionally constructive and progressive. He has also consistently been ranked by scholars as the greatest Brazilian.

== Legacy ==
=== Aftermath of his death ===
The monarchy fell at a point when it had reached its highest popularity among Brazilians, due in part to the abolition of slavery on 13 May 1888. Indifferent to the new heroes, such as Tiradentes, imposed by the new republican government, Brazilians remained attached to the popular Emperor whom they regarded as a hero. He continued to be thought of as a national symbol, the Father of the People personified. This view was even stronger among those of African descent, who equated the monarchy with freedom. Afro-Brazilians demonstrated their feeling of loyalty towards the monarch in subtle ways, such as by having the Imperial Crown tattooed on their bodies.

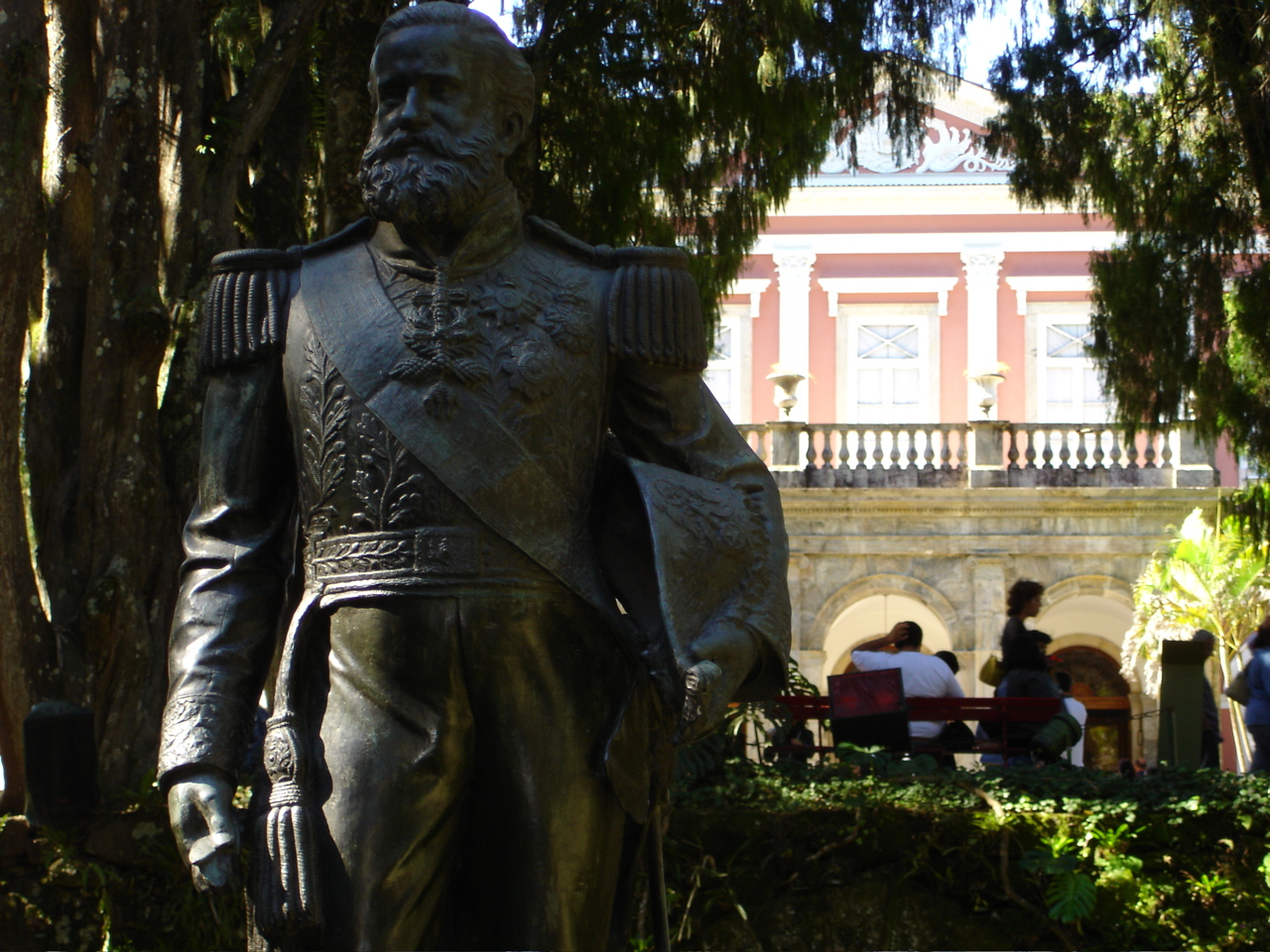
Pedro II became a model of democratic virtues in Brazil following his death in 1891.

In cities throughout the nation, the years immediately following the end of monarchy witnessed the spread of music containing lyrics that reflected popular sentiments favorable to the Emperor. Examples include: "Pedro the Second left / to the kingdom of Lisbon. / The monarchy is over / and now Brazil is adrift." and "The mother of Deodoro said: This son was once mine / Now he is cursed / by me and by God." The Brazilian historian Ricardo Salles argued that among the "great—and few—names in our history [of Brazil] that hold a place in the popular imagination, is certainly the figure of Dom Pedro II." The phenomenon of continued support for the deposed monarch is largely credited to an unextinguished and generally held belief that he was a "wise, benevolent, austere and honest ruler." The positive view towards Pedro II, and nostalgia for his reign, only grew as the nation quickly fell into a series of economic and political crises which Brazilians attributed to the Emperor's overthrow. He never ceased being a popular hero, and would gradually become, once again, an official hero.

Surprisingly strong feelings of guilt were manifested among republicans who had deposed Pedro II, and these became increasingly evident upon the Emperor's death in exile at the end of 1891. In Brazil, the news of the Emperor's death "aroused a genuine sense of regret among those who, without sympathy for a restoration, acknowledged both the merits and the achievements of their deceased ruler." The overthrown monarchy was still a fresh memory to Brazilians, to which was added a feeling of remorse over what they perceived as an unjust exile, followed by his lonely demise. Some republicans "reconsidered the long banishment and reflected upon the severity of such action." Even they believed that Pedro II deserved a better end, and nostalgia spread among them as they "started to see in the Imperial epoch a happier time, a golden age, forever gone." The Empire began to be viewed more tolerantly by the new governments, and its considerable achievements were openly recognized. Now appeared "a feeling that there was once a time when Brazil was more respectable, more honest, and more powerful."

An odd predilection arose on the part of various republican politicians, including those "of higher standing", for "praising D. Pedro II and the monarchy." They did not desire a restoration, but believed that the Brazilian Republic might learn from the fallen regime. Thus, Pedro II "became, paradoxically, a model of republican ideals." To these "republicans, d. Pedro appeared as the best of themselves; for the monarchists the compliment meant, clearly, something else [i.e., that the Emperor was the best of the monarchists]."

After the death of the Emperor, appeals for the repatriation of his body increased over time. The republican periodical A Cidade do Rio (The City of Rio) stated that "Brazil is so large that it cannot begrudge some scant feet of land to him" and demanded: "Bring him back." The Gazeta da Tarde (Afternoon Gazette) said that Pedro II deserved an official funeral within the country. In 1895, Afonso Celso wrote in the Comércio de São Paulo (Commerce of São Paulo): "The body of D. Pedro cannot continue to lie in foreign territory." By 1906 the poet Olavo Bilac wrote, "The fatherland reclaims your body and it shall have it." The Jornal do Comércio (Commerce Newspaper) predicted that "one day, when all passions have lost their strength, your body shall rest here."

=== The end of Pedro II's exile ===
A law was proposed in the Chamber of Deputies to authorize the transfer of the bodies of Pedro II and his wife. Although it had support from old republicans, it was put aside due to a precondition from Princess Isabel that this could only be permitted if the banishment of her family was also rescinded. The dedication of a statue of the Emperor in Petrópolis on 5 February 1911 was attended by more than 1,500 people, including members of the federal government. Several statues of the monarch were erected throughout the country during the following years. At this time, a manifesto written by former Presidents of the Council of Ministers, Lafayette, Ouro Preto and João Alfredo declared that "given the love that Brazilians have for their sovereigns, we agree to the return of the venerable remains back from São Vicente de Fora."

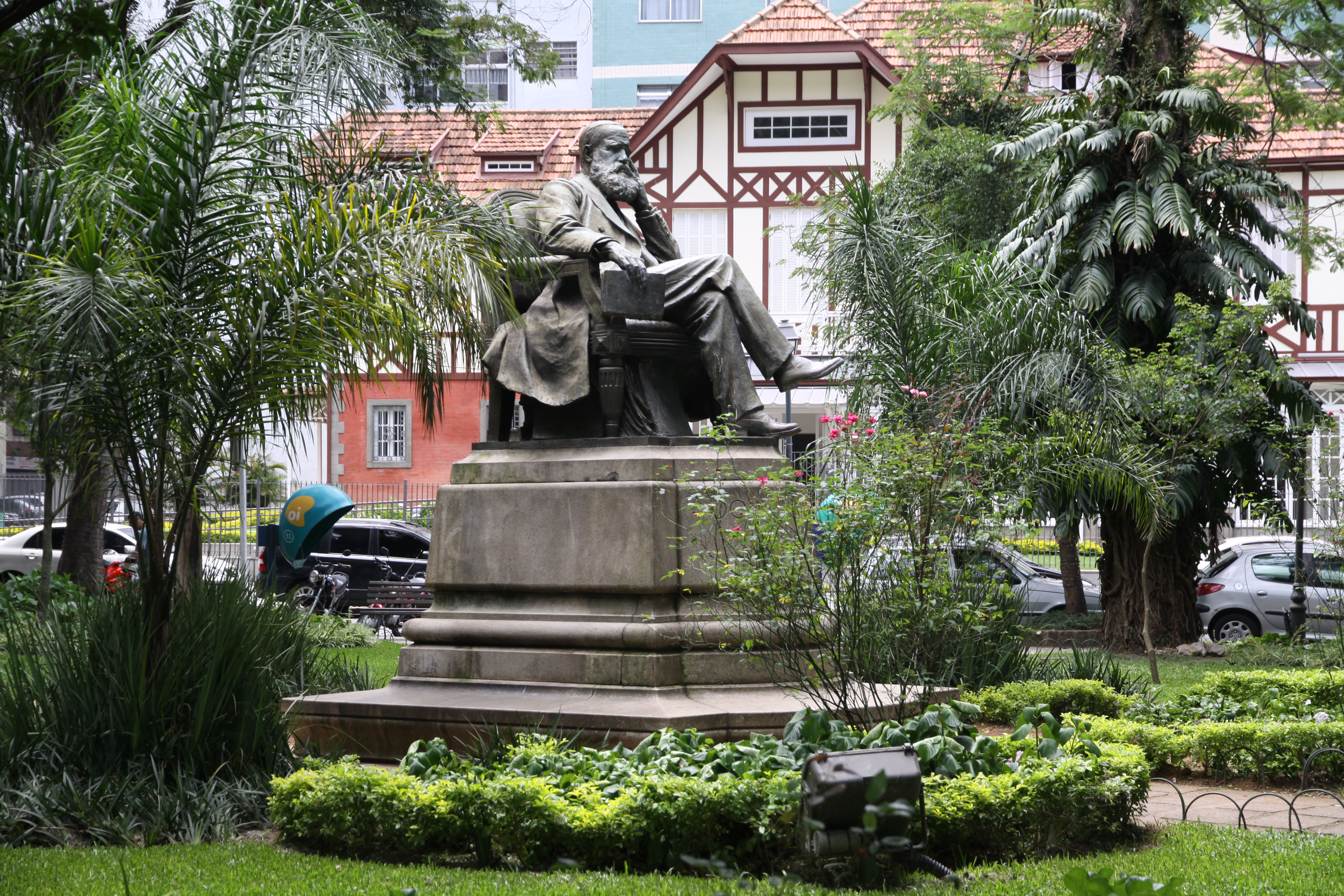
Statue of a pensive Pedro II dedicated in Petrópolis in 1911.

A proposed new bill, which would revoke the banishment, was debated in the Chamber in 1913. The republican deputy Irineu Machado alleged that "futile objections" were being raised which denied "justice to the memory of the emperor." Another member, Martim Francisco de Andrada III, affirmed that "D. Pedro II departed poor, leaving the country rich; it was an injustice that those who are rich and leave the country impoverished be against it." The deputy Pedro Moacir believed that the return of the remains would represent "the perpetual gratitude of posterity towards the most clement, the most tolerant of all monarchs of his time." The deputy Maurício de Lacerda said that "now the traces of his political legacy—honesty—are disappearing." In the Senate, however, the proposal was rejected due to intervention by the caudillo and radical republican Pinheiro Machado. The most famous speech in homage to Pedro II was made in 1914 by the last surviving republican leader of the 1889 coup, the person who had ordered the banishment:

The lack of justice, Mr. Senators, is the great evil of our land, the evil of evils, the origin of all our misfortunes, the source of all our discredit, is the supreme misery of this poor nation. [...] After seeing so much futility triumph, after seeing so much dishonor prosper, after seeing so much power in the hands of evil people grow, man becomes disheartened about virtue, he laughs to himself at honor and becomes ashamed of being honest. This has been the work of the Republic in the last years. In the other regime [the Monarchy] the man who had a certain disgrace in his life was lost forever, as a political career would be closed to him. There was a vigilant sentinel [Dom Pedro II], whose severity everyone feared and that, bright and very high, protected the surroundings as a lighthouse that never fades away, in benefit of honor, justice and morality.

— Senator Rui Barbosa

Two years later, in 1916, President Venceslau Brás agreed to the return of the bodies and revocation of the banishment, but opted to await the end of World War I to officially approve the Act. On 3 September 1920, his successor Epitácio Pessoa signed the law (using a gold quill provided by the Brazilian Press Association) which ended the banishment and allowed repatriation of the remains. Rui Barbosa said that those "who created the federal republic do not have claims against the ashes of the old emperor, whose virtues were much higher than his faults." He concluded, "Therefore, in the republican gallery there is a proper place, and a great one, for D. Pedro II."

=== The Emperor returns home ===
In 1920, the dreadnought São Paulo bore the imperial coffins to Brazil. The Portuguese republican government granted Pedro II an exhumation with dignities befitting a Head of State, and he received the same honors upon arrival in Brazil. The Count of Eu accompanied the remains, along with his only surviving son, Pedro de Alcântara. His wife, Princess Isabel, was elderly, unwell and unable to participate. She died one year later, without ever seeing her homeland again. President Artur Bernardes declared a national holiday and the return of the Emperor was celebrated throughout the nation.

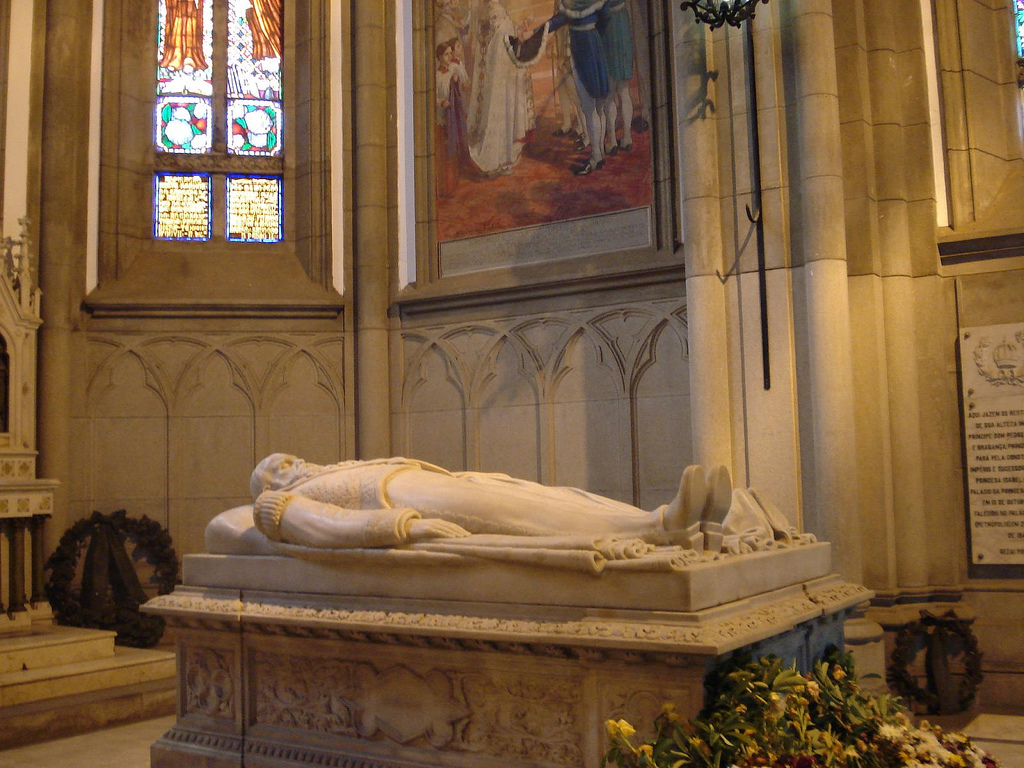
Tomb of Pedro II at the Cathedral of Petrópolis.

In attendance at the main ceremony in Rio de Janeiro was councilor Antonio Prado, the last minister of the Empire still living, who had traveled from São Paulo. Thousands of people attended the event. The "elderly people cried. Many kneeled. All clapped. There was no distinction between republicans and monarchists. They were all Brazilians." It marked the reconciliation of Republican Brazil with its monarchical past. However, "the official return of the figure of d. Pedro as a national hero would truly come only in 1922, owing to the great national commemoration of the centenary celebration of Brazilian independence" during which the Emperor was highly acclaimed.

Three years later, Brazilians spontaneously commemorated Pedro II's centenary. There was a clear "disproportion between the enthusiasm generated by the festivities around the birth of d. Pedro, and the little interest in the anniversary of the Republic, which was then 36 years old." President Artur Bernardes recognized the popularity of the monarch and affirmed that he would not refuse "the justice that the Emperor deserves. He loved Brazil and while he had the strength and energy he served the country together with the best men of that time." Pedro II became, once again, the "Father of the Fatherland" (or "Father of the Nation").

His body was temporarily housed in the Cathedral of Rio de Janeiro until construction on the Cathedral of Petrópolis was complete. The final burial would only occur on 5 December 1939, when the dictator Getúlio Vargas took advantage of the ceremony as an opportunity to benefit his own popularity (just as Mussolini had done during Anita Garibaldi's funeral in 1932). Vargas dedicated the funerary chapel in the Cathedral of Petrópolis where the mortal remains of the Emperor and his wife were interred.

Many of the most profound transformations achieved under Pedro II would survive him. Concepts such as a representative political system and a paradigm of citizenship had been allowed to flourish and become ingrained under the Empire, so much so that they survived "during three succeeding regimes: the Old Republic (1889–1930), the Vargas Era (1930–45), the Liberal Republic (1945–64)." The concept of a nation-state, as envisioned by Pedro II, was even appropriated by the military which seized control during 1964. Though during the 1980s, this concept began to change, it still endures. At the beginning of the twenty-first century his "name is widely employed to evoke both traditional values and the nation's heritage. His image confers respectability, dignity, and integrity on whatever event or institution employs it."

== Historical assessments ==
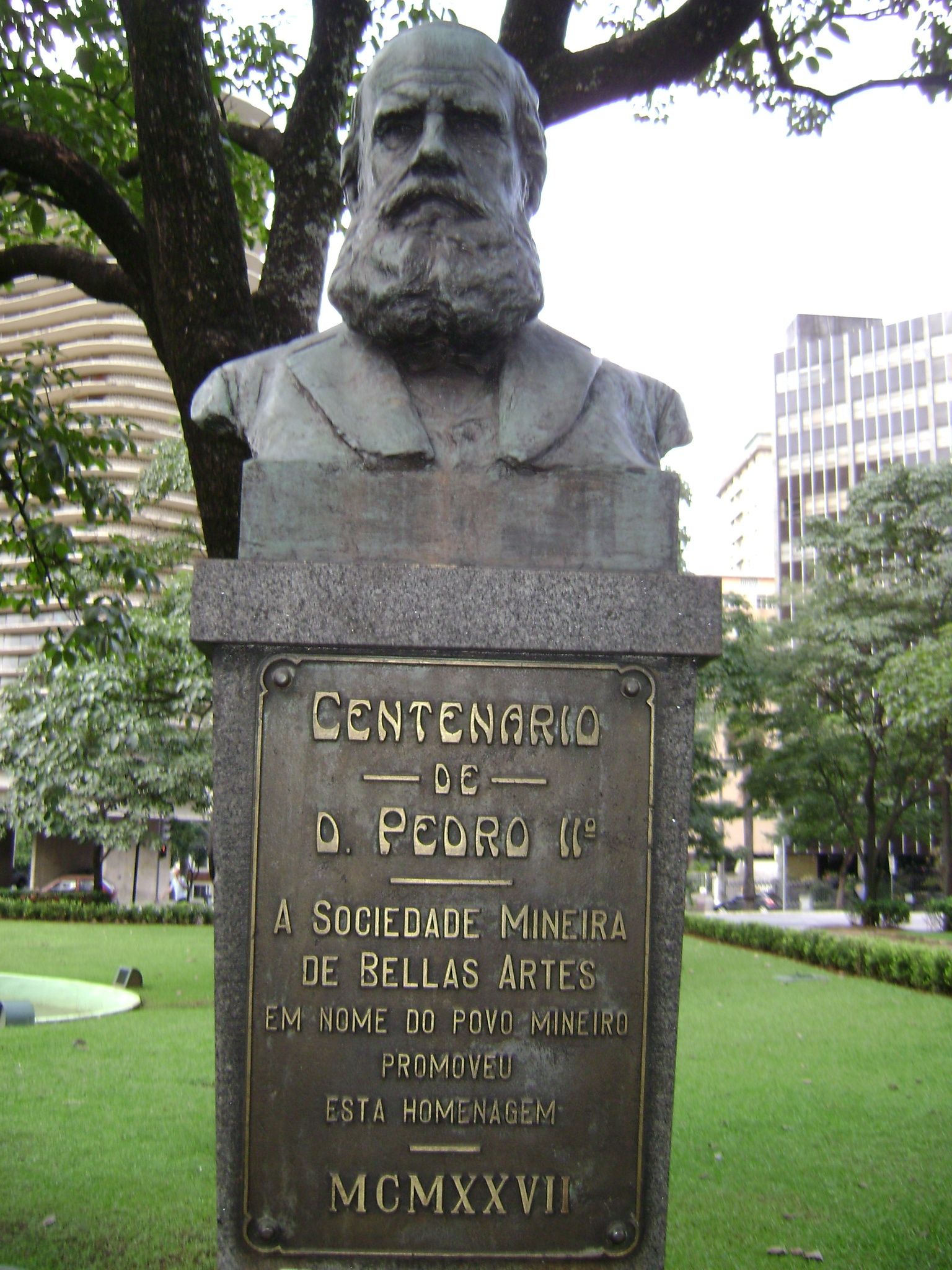
Bust of Pedro II in Belo Horizonte, capital of Minas Gerais state, dedicated in 1925.

Historians have expressed high regard for Pedro II and his reign. The scholarly literature dealing with him is vast and, with the exception of the period immediately after his ouster, overwhelmingly positive, and even laudatory. Emperor Pedro II is usually regarded by historians in Brazil as the greatest Brazilian. In a manner quite similar to methods which had been used by the republican politicians, historians point to the Emperor's virtues as an example to be followed, although none go so far as to advocate a restoration of the monarchy. "Most twentieth-century historians, moreover, have looked back on the period [of Pedro II's reign] nostalgically, using their descriptions of the Empire to criticize—sometimes subtly, sometimes not—Brazil's subsequent republican or dictatorial regimes."

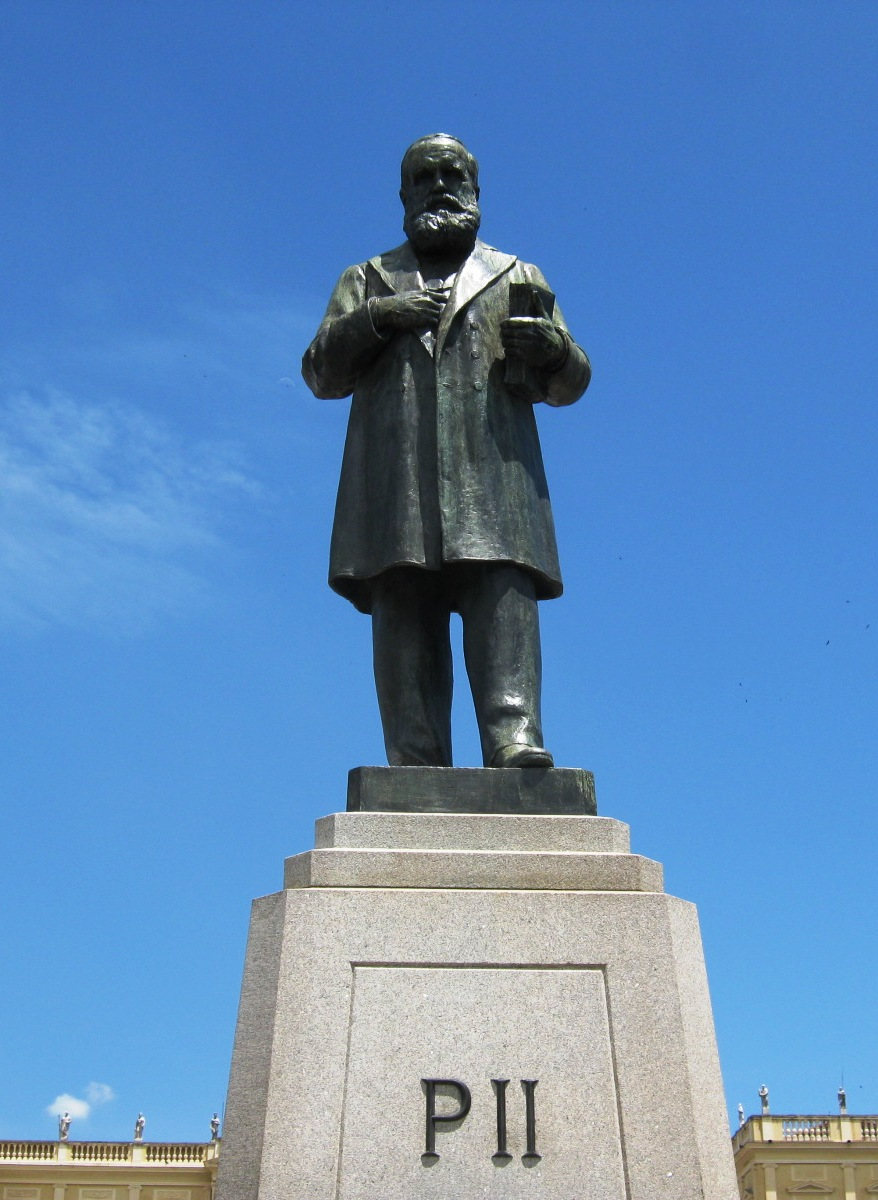
Statue of Pedro II in front of the Palace of São Cristóvão, Rio de Janeiro.

American historian Dana Munro wrote in her study about Latin America that Pedro II "grew up to be serious minded, irreproachable in his private life, and indefatigable in the performance of what he considered his duty." She added that he was "an able and intelligent ruler if not a great statesman". (Note: "Under the new Emperor, Brazil was to enjoy nearly half a century of internal peace and rapid material progress. Despite his youth, Pedro II soon showed a surprising capacity to give the country precisely the kind of government that its political development seemed to demand. Educated by conscientious tutors under a strict regime that left him little opportunity for contact with the court influences which had shaped his father’s character, he grew up to be serious minded, irreproachable in his private life, and indefatigable in the performance of what he considered his duty. He was keenly interested in art, science, and literature, well-informed though not profound or brilliant, an able and intelligent ruler if not a great statesman. His subjects loved him for his simplicity and his democratic ways even when they regarded his weakness with tolerant amusement or criticized his official acts with all the freedom permitted by an extremely broad-minded and tolerant policy toward the press." —Dana Gardner Munro in Munro 1942, pp. 273–274.) Another American historian writing on Brazilian history, Thomas Skidmore, remarked that the Emperor "brought a natural talent to his work. Even at age 14, he was steady, equilibrated and discrete". He states that during "his reign, he acquired the reputation of being just and objective, projecting the image of an honest and ethical sovereign who would not hesitate in disciplining politicians who were caught turning away from his strict standards". (Note: "Pedro II brought a natural talent to his work. Even at age 14, he was steady, equilibrated and discrete. The young emperor had another advantage. As his father said on the eve of his departure in 1831: 'My son has an advantage over me; that is the fact that he is Brazilian, and the Brazilians like him. He will reign without difficulty and the Constitution will guarantee his prerogatives.' During his reign, he acquired the reputation of being just and objective, projecting the image of an honest and ethical sovereign who would not hesitate in disciplining politicians who were caught turning away from his strict standards. In this he resembled Queen Victoria, his British contemporary, whose long reign (1837–1901) in great measure was parallel to his. Pedro II became more and more a point of reference for the elite, who used its straightness and firm pulse to move the country far away from the "unstable" Latin American republics." —Thomas E. Skidmore in Skidmore 2003, p. 73.) The British historian Roderick. J. Barman wrote in his biography of Pedro II that he "was at once the model emperor and the model citizen. He literally and metaphorically towered above his fellow Brazilians. Pedro II's achievements at home and the high reputation he established abroad convinced Brazilians that the goals he advocated would create a country as powerful and as civilized as France, Great Britain or the United States". (Note: "The task of transforming Brazil into a functioning nation-state fell to a boy aged fourteen. Pedro II devoted himself during the next half century to meeting the formidable challenge. 'During what is now a long life,' he reflected in November 1891, 'I have applied all my forces and all my devotion to assuring the progress and the prosperity of my people.' Resourceful, patient, and above all persevering, he eschewed bold initiatives and avoided confrontations. The emperor first established an undisputed dominance over public affairs, his integrity and his impartiality being respected by all. Even more important, the public persona he developed embodied the values which the ruling elements in Brazil wished for their country. He was at once the model emperor and the model citizen. He literally and metaphorically towered above his fellow Brazilians. Pedro II's achievements at home and the high reputation he established abroad convinced Brazilians that the goals he advocated would create a country as powerful and as civilized as France, Great Britain or the United States." —Roderick J. Barman in Barman 1999, pp. XIII–XIV.)

The Brazilian American historian Richard Graham praised Brazilian politics affirming that "Brazil enjoyed all appearances of a functioning representative democracy. Foreign observers were virtually unanimous in praising a political system that seemed so like the bourgeois regimes of Europe. The main focus of their enthusiasm lay in the regularity of elections and in the alternation of parties in power. The government scrupulously observed the Constitution, individual rights seemed protected, and no military leader or other dictator overthrew the elected government." (Note: "Throughout the half-century reign of Pedro II, Brazil enjoyed all appearances of a functioning representative democracy. Foreign observers were virtually unanimous in praising a political system that seemed so like the bourgeois regimes of Europe. The main focus of their enthusiasm lay in the regularity of elections and in the alternation of parties in power. The government scrupulously observed the Constitution, individual rights seemed protected, and no military leader or other dictator overthrew the elected government. A Senate of 50 members, chosen for life, and a Chamber with approximately 120 Deputies formed the legislature. Parliamentary government meant that, in practice, Cabinets had to receive the approval of the legislature in order to govern, even if the Emperor could dismiss one Cabinet and summon another." —Richard Graham in Graham 1994, p. 71.) The Brazilian historian Pedro Calmon in his work covering Brazilian history asserted that during Pedro II's reign the "politics became British–like, and were improved, creating processes which began to function under the vigilant eyes of the emperor", and which allowed "the evolution of democracy in Brazil". (Note: "The revolution which occurred in Pernambuco in 1848—Rio Grande do Sul had been pacified since 1845—ended a cycle of civil–military agitations that disturbed, during the regency and beyond, the life of the nation. The politics became British–like, and were improved, creating processes which began to function under the vigilant eyes of the emperor, whose personal power spanned the long period from 1840 to 1889. The peace was concluded and allowed, with the implementation of his ideals, the evolution of democracy in Brazil. There is not a more continuous period of tranquility in the history of South America, so different than the experiences of Brazil's neighbors [the South American republics formerly ruled by Spain] that J.B. Alberdi considered this the 'Brazilian miracle'. When the throne fell in 1889, Rojas Paúl, president of Venezuela, said, 'It has ended the only republic that existed in [South] America: the Empire of Brazil.' Mitre called it 'a crowned democracy'." —Pedro Calmon in Calmon 2002, p. 217.)

José Murilo de Carvalho, a biographer of the Emperor, wrote that at the time he was deposed the nation had been consolidated, the slave trade had been abolished, and the foundations of a representative system had been established due to uninterrupted elections and broad freedom of the press. He remarked that for "the longevity of his government and the transformations effected during its course, no other head of State has marked more deeply the history of the country." (Note: "D. Pedro ruled Brazil from 23 July 1840 up to 15 November 1889. It was 49 years, three months and 22 days, almost half a century. He assumed power when less than fifteen years old during a turbulent phase in the national life when Rio Grande do Sul was an independent republic, the Maranhão faced the revolt of the Balaiada, the bloody war of Cabanagem in Pará had barely ended, and England threatened the country with retaliation due to the slave traffic. He was deposed and exiled at 65 years old, leaving a consolidated nation, having abolished the slave trade, and having established the foundations of a representative system, thanks to uninterrupted elections and great freedom of the press. For the longevity of his government and the transformations effected during its course, no other head of State has marked more deeply the history of the country." —José Murilo de Carvalho in Carvalho 2007, p. 9.)

The historian Pedro Karp Vasquez wrote that the Emperor ushered "the country into a period of stability and prosperity after 1850. Enormously interested in everything that was related to scientific discoveries, Dom Pedro II sought to modernize the nation, in many instances anticipating initiatives in European nations." (Note: "Although having assumed power at a very young age by means of the contrived Majority of 23 July 1840, when he had not yet attained the age of 15 years, Dom Pedro II made the Second Empire a period of stability and growth for Brazil. Reserved and melancholic, Dom Pedro II was different in everything from his impetuous father, having remained in power for almost fifty years in one of history's longest reigns. Without having become obsessed by power—which he neglected in favor of studies—Dom Pedro II knew how to assert himself, even while young, and to balance between 'luzias' (liberals) and 'saquaremas' (conservatives), ushering the country into a period of stability and prosperity after 1850. Enormously interested in everything that was related to scientific discoveries, Dom Pedro II sought to modernize the nation, in many instances anticipating initiatives in European nations." —Pedro Karp Vasquez in Vasquez 2007, p. 38.) Another biographer of Pedro II, Renato Sêneca Fleury, remarked that "in the History of Brazil, the pages dedicated to Pedro II, ascribe to him complete justice, heightening his moral greatness, his immense patriotism and the great well-being he accorded to Brazil" and that he "became immortal in the heart of the Brazilian people. Schools, libraries, hospitals, cultural societies, theaters, streets, squares, here, there, all over Brazil, exist which have received Pedro II's name." (Note: "...in the History of Brazil, the pages dedicated to Pedro II, ascribe to him complete justice, heightening his moral greatness, his immense patriotism and the great well–being he accorded to Brazil. Pedro II became immortal in the heart of the Brazilian people. Schools, libraries, hospitals, cultural societies, theaters, streets, squares, here, there, all over Brazil, exist which have received Pedro II's name." —Renato Sêneca Fleury in Fleury c. 1940s, p. 55.) Notable instances include Colégio Pedro II, a traditional school in the state of Rio de Janeiro; Estrada de Ferro Dom Pedro II, an important railway which used to connect the states of Rio de Janeiro, São Paulo and Minas Gerais; Hospício Pedro II, the first psychiatric hospital in Brazil and second in Latin America; Theatro Pedro II, a theater and opera house in the state of São Paulo and Pedro II, a city in the northeastern state of Piauí.
