= Brazilian battleship São Paulo =

Brazilian dreadnought battleship

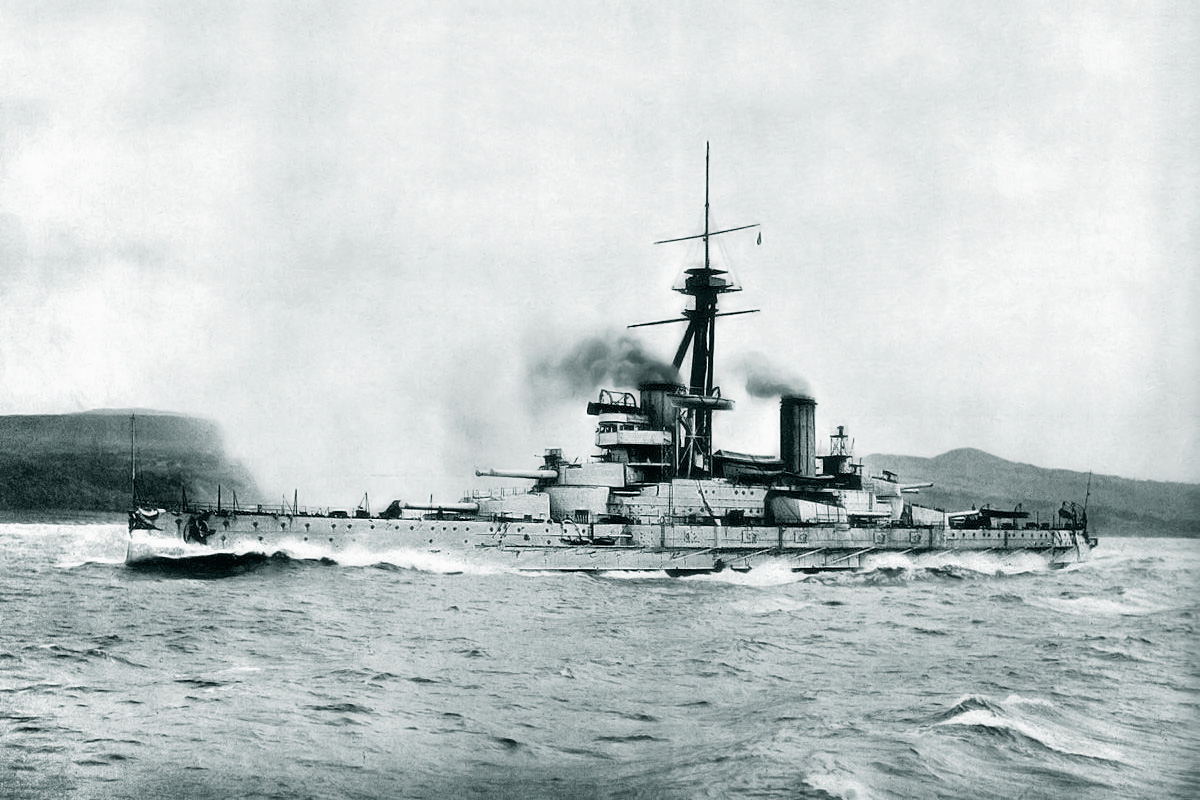
- São Paulo on its sea trials, 1910

History

Brazil
- Name: São Paulo
- Namesake: The state and city of São Paulo
- Builder: Vickers, Barrow-in-Furness, United Kingdom
- Laid down: 30 April 1907
- Launched: 19 April 1909
- Commissioned: 12 July 1910
- Stricken: 2 August 1947
- Motto: Non Ducor, Duco (Note: The English translation of this Latin phrase is "I am not led, I lead". São Paulo shared this motto with the city the ship was named after.)
- Fate: Sank 1951 while en route to be scrapped

General characteristics
- Class & type: Minas Geraes-class battleship
- Displacement: 19,105 tons standard (Note: Topliss includes specific displacement figures for São Paulo which differ from Minas Geraes.); 21,370 tons full load
- Length: 500 ft (150 m) p.p; 543 ft (166 m) overall
- Beam: 83 ft (25 m)
- Draft: 24 ft 8.75 in (7.5375 m) normal; 27 ft 3 in (8.31 m) full load
- Installed power: 23,500 shp (17,524 kW; design); 23,400 ihp (design); 27,500 ihp (actual)
- Propulsion: 2-shaft reciprocating vertical triple-expansion (VTE) steam engines; 18 Babcock & Wilcox boilers
- Speed: 21.5 knots (39.8 km/h; 24.7 mph)
- Endurance: 10,000 nautical miles @ 10 knots (11,500 mi @ 11.5 mph or 18,500 km @ 18.5 km/h)
- Armament: 12 × 12-inch (304.8 mm) main guns (6 × 2); 22 × 4.7 in (120 mm) guns; 18 × 3-pounder (47 mm) guns; 8 × 1 pdr (37 mm) guns
- Armour: Belt: 9 to 3 in (229 to 76 mm) (upper belt 9 in); Upper deck: 1.5 in (38 mm); Main deck: 2 in (51 mm); Turrets: 12 in (300 mm) face, 8 in (200 mm) sides, 3 to 2 in (76 to 51 mm) roofs; Barbettes: 9 in (230 mm); Conning tower: 12 in (300 mm),2 in (51 mm) sides and roof
- Notes: Characteristics are as built; cf. Specifications of the Minas Geraes-class battleships

São Paulo was a dreadnought battleship of the Brazilian Navy. It was the second of two ships in the Minas Geraes class, and was named after the state and city of São Paulo.

The British company Vickers constructed São Paulo, launching it on 19 April 1909. The ship was commissioned into the Brazilian Navy on 12 July 1910. Soon after, it was involved in the Revolt of the Lash (Revolta de Chibata), in which crews on four Brazilian warships mutinied over poor pay and harsh punishments for even minor offenses. After entering the First World War, Brazil offered to send São Paulo and its sister Minas Geraes to Britain for service with the Grand Fleet, but Britain declined since both vessels were in poor condition and lacked the latest fire control technology. In June 1918, Brazil sent São Paulo to the United States for a full refit that was not completed until 7 January 1920, well after the war had ended. On 6 July 1922, São Paulo fired its guns in anger for the first time when it attacked a fort that had been taken during the Copacabana Fort revolt. Two years later, mutineers took control of the ship and sailed it to Montevideo in Uruguay, where they obtained asylum.

In the 1930s, São Paulo was passed over for modernization due to its poor condition—it could reach a top speed of only 10 knots (19 km/h; 12 mph), less than half its design speed. For the rest of its career, the ship was reduced to a reserve coastal defense role. When Brazil entered the Second World War, São Paulo sailed to Recife and remained there as the port's main defense for the duration of the war. Stricken in 1947, the dreadnought remained as a training vessel until 1951, when it was taken under tow to be scrapped in the United Kingdom. The tow lines broke during a strong gale in early November when the ships were 150 nmi (280 km; 170 mi) north of the Azores, and São Paulo was lost.

== Background ==
Beginning in the late 1880s, Brazil's navy fell into obsolescence, a situation exacerbated by an 1889 coup d'état, which deposed Emperor Dom Pedro II, and an 1893 civil war. (Note: The civil war began in the southern state of Rio Grande do Sul. Later in 1893, Rear Admiral Custódio José de Mello, the minister of the navy, revolted against President Floriano Peixoto, bringing nearly all of the Brazilian warships currently in the country with him. Mello's forces took Desterro when the governor surrendered, and began to coordinate with the revolutionaries in Rio Grande do Sul, but loyal Brazilian forces eventually overwhelmed them both. Most of the rebel naval forces were sailed to Argentina, where their crews surrendered; the flagship, Aquidabã, held out near Desterro until sunk by a torpedo boat.) Despite having nearly three times the population of Argentina and almost five times the population of Chile, by the end of the 19th century Brazil was lagging behind the Chilean and Argentine navies in quality and total tonnage. (Note: Chile's naval tonnage was 36,896 long tons (37,488 t), Argentina's 34,425 long tons (34,977 t), and Brazil's 27,661 long tons (28,105 t). For an account of the Argentinian–Chilean naval arms races, see Scheina, Naval History, 45–52.)

At the turn of the 20th century, soaring demand for coffee and rubber brought prosperity to the Brazilian economy. The government of Brazil used some of the extra money from this economic growth to finance a naval building program in 1904, which authorized the construction of a large number of warships, including three battleships. The minister of the navy, Admiral Júlio César de Noronha, signed a contract with Armstrong Whitworth for three battleships on 23 July 1906. The new dreadnought battleship design, which debuted in December 1906 with the completion of the namesake ship, rendered the Brazilian ships, and all other existing capital ships, obsolete.

The money authorized for naval expansion was redirected by the new Minister of the Navy, Rear Admiral Alexandrino Fario de Alencar, to building two dreadnoughts, with plans for a third dreadnought after the first was completed, two scout cruisers (which became the Bahia class), ten destroyers (the Pará class), and three submarines. The three battleships on which construction had just begun were scrapped beginning on 7 January 1907, and the design of the new dreadnoughts was approved by the Brazilians on 20 February 1907. In South America, the ships came as a shock and kindled a naval arms race among Brazil, Argentina, and Chile. The 1902 treaty between the latter two was canceled upon the Brazilian dreadnought order so both could be free to build their own dreadnoughts.

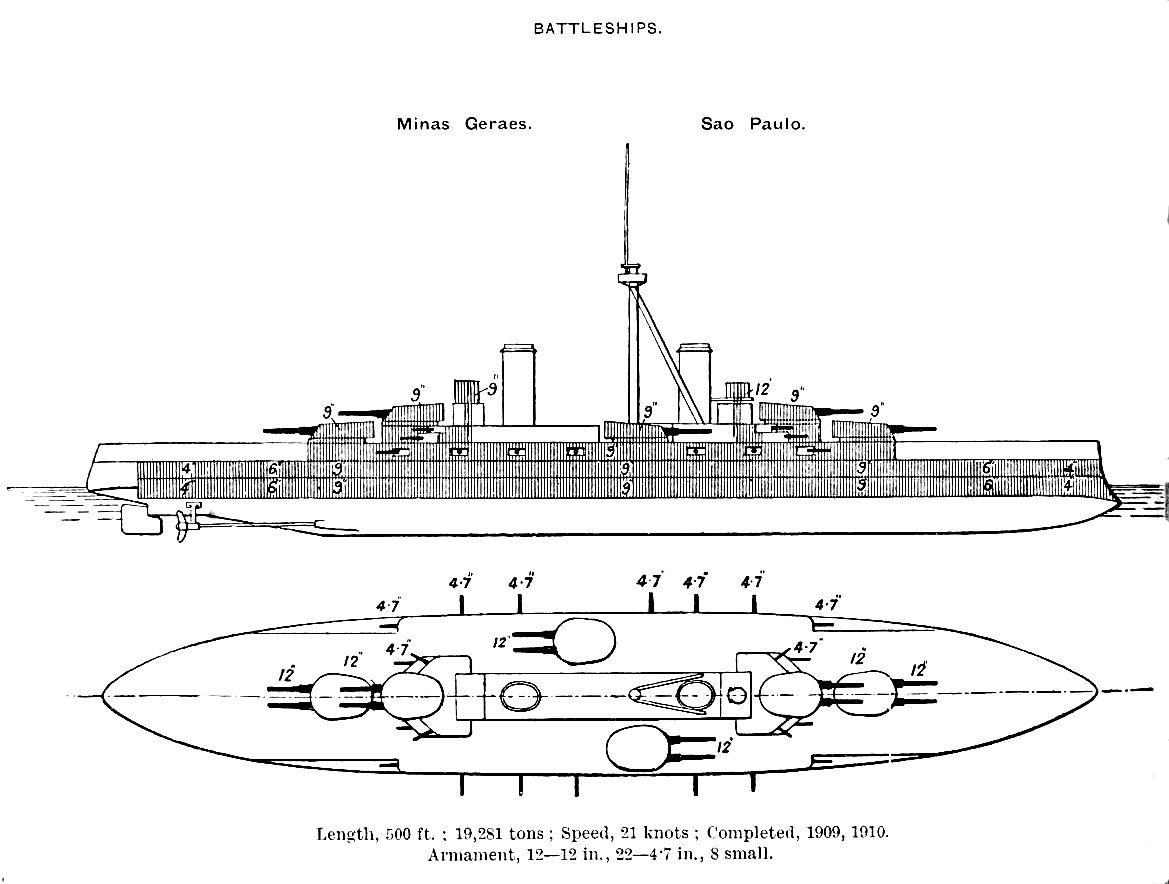
Line drawing of a Minas Geraes-class battleship

Minas Geraes, the lead ship, was laid down by Armstrong on 17 April 1907, while São Paulo followed thirteen days later at Vickers. The news shocked Brazil's neighbors, especially Argentina, whose Minister of Foreign Affairs remarked that either Minas Geraes or São Paulo could destroy the entire Argentine and Chilean fleets. In addition, Brazil's order meant that they had laid down a dreadnought before many of the other major maritime powers, such as Germany, France or Russia, (Note: Although Germany laid down Nassau two months after Minas Geraes, Nassau was commissioned first.) and the two ships made Brazil the third country to have dreadnoughts under construction, behind the United Kingdom and the United States.

Newspapers and journals around the world, particularly in Britain and Germany, speculated that Brazil was acting as a proxy for a naval power which would take possession of the two dreadnoughts soon after completion, as they did not believe that a previously insignificant geopolitical power would contract for such powerful warships. Despite this, the United States actively attempted to court Brazil as an ally; caught up in the spirit, U.S. naval journals began using terms like "Pan Americanism" and "Hemispheric Cooperation".

== Early career ==
São Paulo was christened by Régis de Oliveira, the wife of Brazil's minister to Great Britain, and launched at Barrow-in-Furness on 19 April 1909 with many South American diplomats and naval officers in attendance. The ship was commissioned on 12 July, and after fitting-out and sea trials, it left Greenock on 16 September 1910. Shortly thereafter, it stopped in Cherbourg, France, to embark the Brazilian President Hermes Rodrigues da Fonseca. Departing on the 27th, São Paulo sailed to Lisbon, Portugal, where Fonseca was a guest of Portugal's King Manuel II. Soon after they arrived the 5 October 1910 revolution began, which caused the fall of the Portuguese monarchy. Although the president offered political asylum to the king and his family, the offer was refused. A rumor that the king was on board, circulated by newspapers and reported to the Brazilian legation in Paris, led revolutionaries to attempt to search the ship, but they were denied permission. They also asked for Brazil to land marines "to help in the maintenance of order", but this request was also denied. São Paulo left Lisbon on 7 October for Rio de Janeiro, and docked there on 25 October.

=== Revolt of the Lash ===
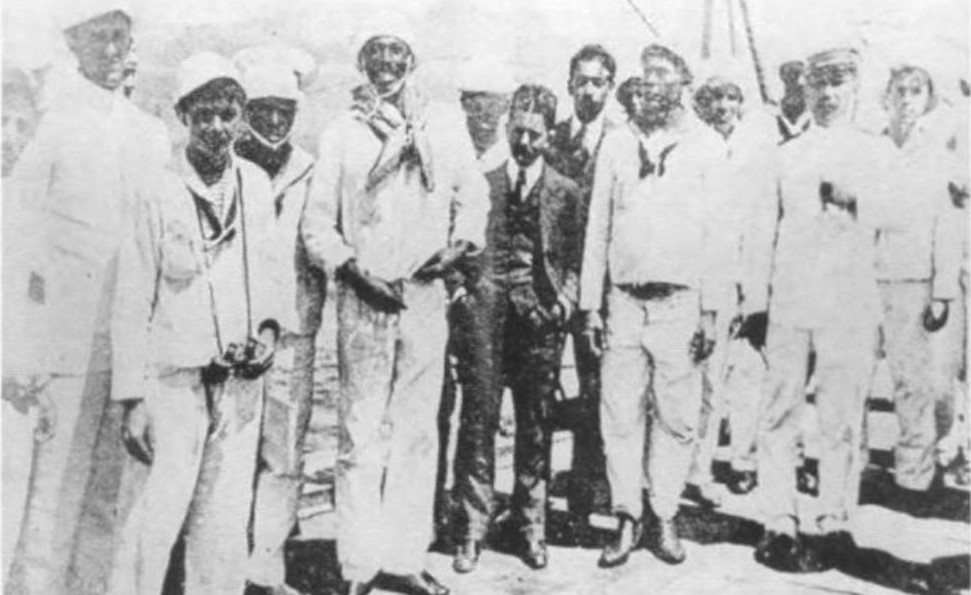
João Cândido (front row, directly to the left of the man in the dark suit) with reporters, officers and sailors onboard Minas Geraes on 26 November 1910, the last day of the Revolt of the Lash

Soon after São Paulo's arrival, a major rebellion known as the Revolt of the Lash, or Revolta da Chibata, broke out on four of the newest ships in the Brazilian Navy. The initial spark was provided on 16 November 1910 when Afro-Brazilian sailor Marcelino Rodrigues Menezes was brutally flogged 250 times for insubordination. (Note: The sailor's back was later described by José Carlos de Carvalho, a retired navy captain assigned to be the Brazilian government's representative to the mutineers, as "a mullet sliced open for salting.") Many Afro-Brazilian sailors were sons of former slaves, or were former slaves freed under the Lei Áurea (abolition) but forced to enter the navy. They had been planning a revolt for some time, and Menezes became the catalyst. Further preparations were needed, so the rebellion was delayed until 22 November. The crewmen of Minas Geraes, São Paulo, the twelve-year-old Deodoro, and the new Bahia quickly took their vessels with only a minimum of bloodshed: two officers on Minas Geraes and one each on São Paulo and Bahia were killed.

The ships were well-supplied with foodstuffs, ammunition, and coal, and the only demand of mutineers—led by João Cândido—was the abolition of "slavery as practiced by the Brazilian Navy". They objected to low pay, long hours, inadequate training, and punishments including bolo (being struck on the hand with a ferrule) and the use of whips or lashes (chibata), which eventually became a symbol of the revolt. By the 23rd, the National Congress had begun discussing the possibility of a general amnesty for the sailors. Senator Ruy Barbosa, long an opponent of slavery, lent a large amount of support, and the measure unanimously passed the Federal Senate on 24 November. The measure was then sent to the Chamber of Deputies.

Humiliated by the revolt, naval officers and the president of Brazil were staunchly opposed to amnesty, so they quickly began planning to assault the rebel ships. The officers believed such an action was necessary to restore the service's honor. The rebels, believing an attack was imminent, sailed their ships out of Guanabara Bay and spent the night of 23–24 November at sea, returning only during daylight. Late on the 24th, the President ordered the naval officers to attack the mutineers. Officers crewed some smaller warships and the cruiser Rio Grande do Sul, Bahia's sister ship with ten 4.7-inch guns. They planned to attack on the morning of the 25th, when the government expected the mutineers would return to Guanabara Bay. When they did not return and the amnesty measure neared passage in the Chamber of Deputies, the order was rescinded. After the bill passed 125–23 and the president signed it into law, the mutineers stood down on the 26th.

During the revolt, the ships were noted by many observers to be well handled, despite a previous belief that the Brazilian Navy was incapable of effectively operating the ships even before being split by a rebellion. João Cândido ordered all liquor thrown overboard, and discipline on the ships was recognized as exemplary. The 4.7-inch guns were often used for shots over the city, but the 12-inch guns were not, which led to a suspicion among the naval officers that the rebels were incapable of using the weapons. Later research and interviews indicate that Minas Geraes' guns were fully operational, and while São Paulo's could not be turned after salt water contaminated the hydraulic system, British engineers still on board the ship after the voyage from the United Kingdom were working on the problem. Still, historians have never ascertained how well the mutineers could handle the ships.

=== First World War ===
The Brazilian government declared that the country would be neutral in the First World War on 4 August 1914. The sinking of Brazilian merchant ships by German U-boats led them to revoke their neutrality, then declare war on 26 October 1917. By this time, São Paulo was no longer one of the world's most powerful battleships. Despite an identified need for more modern fire control, it had not been fitted with any of the advances in that technology that had appeared since its construction, and it was in poor condition. For these reasons the Royal Navy declined a Brazilian offer to send it and Minas Geraes to serve with the Grand Fleet. In an attempt to bring the battleship up to international standards, Brazil sent São Paulo to the United States in June 1918 to receive a full refit. Soon after it departed the naval base in Rio de Janeiro, fourteen of the eighteen boilers powering the dreadnought broke down. The American battleship Nebraska, which was in the area after transporting the body of the late Uruguayan Minister to the United States to Montevideo, rendered assistance in the form of temporary repairs after the ships put in at Bahia. Escorted by Nebraska and another American ship, Raleigh, São Paulo made it to the New York Naval Yard after a 42-day journey.

== Major refit and the 1920s ==
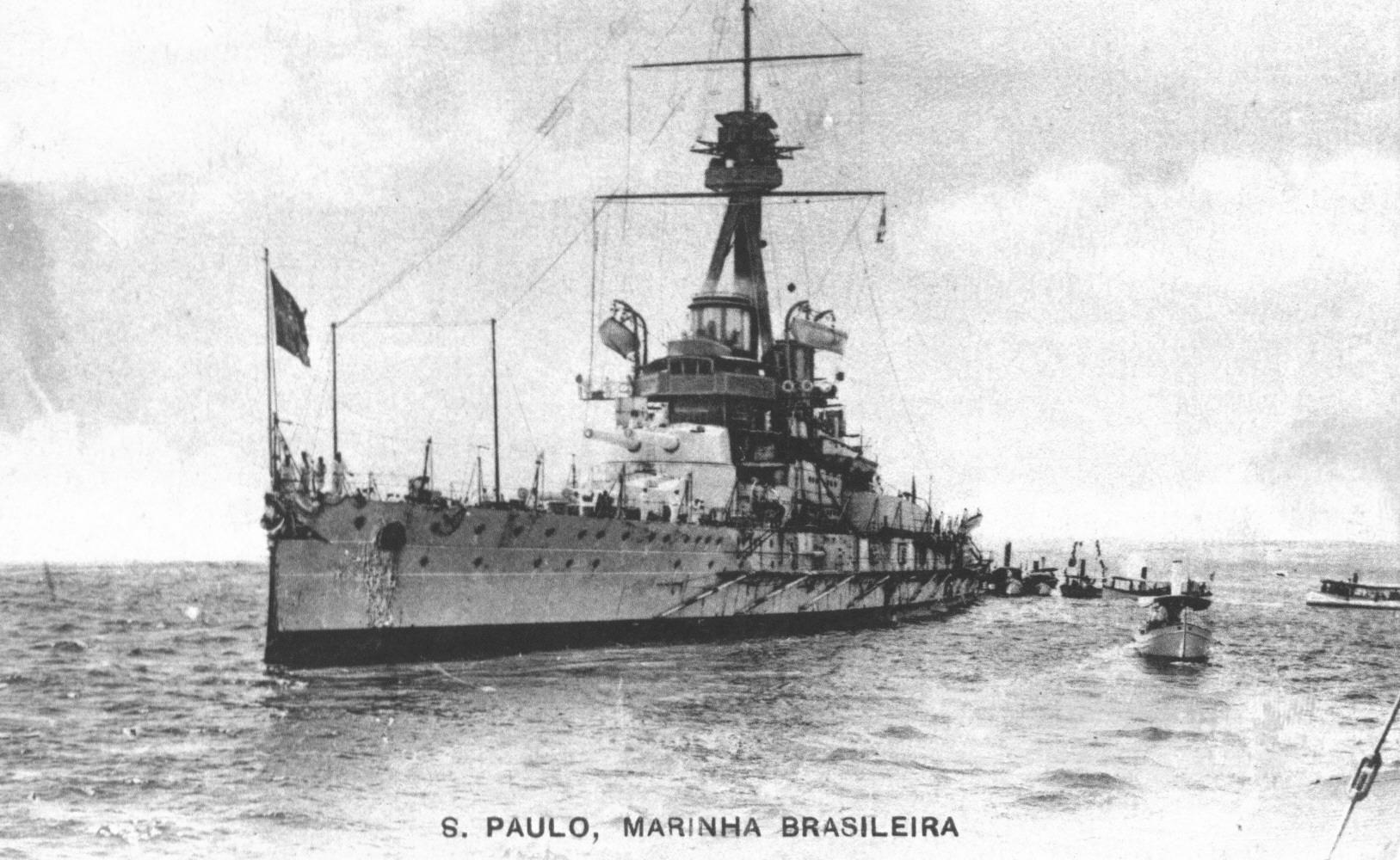
São Paulo seen at an unknown point in its career

São Paulo underwent a refit in New York, beginning on 7 August 1918 and completing on 7 January 1920. Many of its crewmen were assigned to American warships during this time for training. It received Sperry fire control equipment and Bausch and Lomb range-finders for the two superfiring turrets fore and aft. A vertical armor bulkhead was fitted inside all six main turrets, and the secondary battery of 4.7 in (120 mm) casemate guns was reduced from twenty-two to twelve guns. A few modern AA guns were fitted as well: two 3"/50 caliber guns from Bethlehem Steel were added on the aft superstructure, 37 mm guns were added near each turret, and 3 pounders were removed from the top of turrets.

After the refit was completed, São Paulo picked up ammunition in Gravesend and sailed to Cuba for firing trials. Seven members of the United States' Bureau of Standards traveled with the ship from New York and observed the operations, which were conducted in the Gulf of Guacanayabo. After dropping the Americans off in Guantánamo Bay, São Paulo returned home in early 1920. August 1920 saw the dreadnought sailing to Belgium, where King Albert I and Queen Elisabeth were embarked on 1 September to bring them to Brazil. After bringing the royals home, São Paulo traveled to Portugal to bring the remains of the former emperor Pedro II and his wife, Teresa Cristina, back to Brazil. (Note: cf. Legacy of Pedro II of Brazil.)

In 1922, São Paulo and Minas Geraes helped to put down the first of the Tenente revolts. Soldiers seized Fort Copacabana in Rio de Janeiro on 5 July, but no other men joined them. As a result, some men deserted the rebels, and by the next morning only 200 people remained in the fort. São Paulo bombarded the fort, firing five salvos and obtained at least two hits; the fort surrendered half an hour later. The Brazilian Navy's official history of the ship reports that one of the hits opened a hole ten meters deep.

Crewmen aboard São Paulo rebelled on 4 November 1924, when First Lieutenant Hercolino Cascardo, seven second lieutenants and 260 others commandeered the ship. After the boilers were fired, São Paulo's mutineers attempted to entice the crews of Minas Geraes and the other ships nearby to join. They were able to sway the crew of only one old torpedo boat to the cause. The battleship's crew, angry that Minas Geraes would not join them, fired a six-pounder at Minas Geraes that wounded a cook. The mutineers then sailed out of Rio de Janeiro's harbor, where the forts at Santa Cruz and Copacabana engaged her, damaging São Paulo's fire control system and funnel. The forts stopped firing soon after the battleship returned fire due to concern over possible civilian casualties. The crewmen aboard São Paulo attempted to join revolutionaries in Rio Grande do Sul, but when they found that the rebel forces had moved inland, they set course for Montevideo, Uruguay. They arrived on 10 November, where the rebellious members of the crew disembarked and were granted asylum, and Minas Geraes, which had been pursuing São Paulo, escorted the wayward ship home to Rio de Janeiro, arriving on the 21st.

== Late career ==
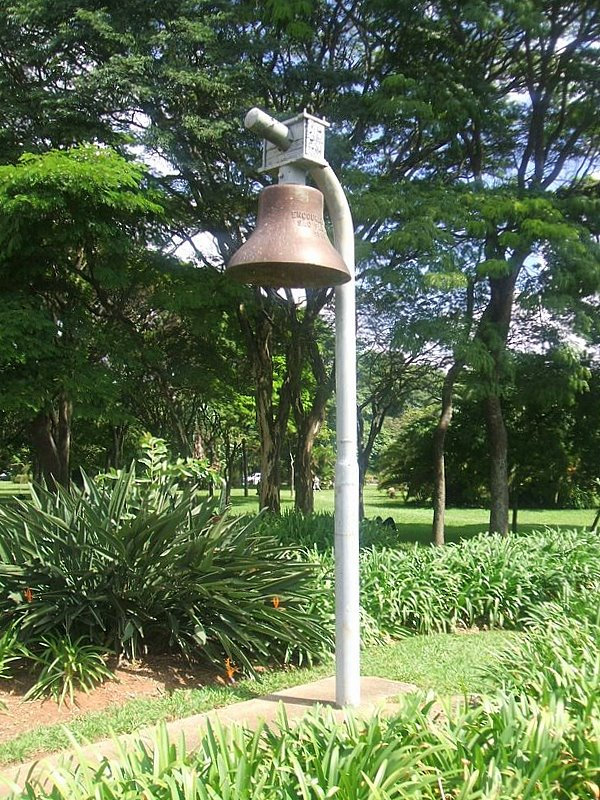
São Paulo's bell at Ibirapuera Park, in the city of São Paulo

In the 1930s, Brazil decided to modernize both São Paulo and Minas Geraes. São Paulo's dilapidated state made this uneconomic; at the time it could sail at a maximum of 10 knots (19 km/h; 12 mph), less than half its design speed. As a result, while Minas Geraes was thoroughly refitted from 1931 to 1938 in the Rio de Janeiro Naval Yard, São Paulo was employed as a coast-defense ship, a role in which it remained for the rest of its service life. During the 1932 Constitutionalist Revolution, it acted as the flagship of a naval blockade of Santos. After repairs in 1934 and 1935, the ship returned to lead three naval training exercises. In the same year, accompanied by the Brazilian cruisers Bahia and Rio Grande do Sul, the Argentine battleships Rivadavia and Moreno, six Argentine cruisers, and a group of destroyers, São Paulo carried the Brazilian President Getúlio Vargas up the River Plate to Buenos Aires to meet with the presidents of Argentina and Uruguay.

In 1936, the crew of São Paulo, as well as Rio Grande do Sul's crew, played in the Liga Carioca de Football's Open Tournament, a cup where many amateur teams had the chance to play the likes of Flamengo and Fluminense.

As in the First World War, Brazil stayed neutral during the opening years of the Second World War, until U-boat attacks drove the country to declare war on Germany and Italy on 21 August 1942. The age and condition of São Paulo relegated it to the role of harbor defense ship; it set sail for Recife on 23 November 1942 escorted by American destroyers Badger and Davis, and served as the main defense of the port for the war, only returning to Rio de Janeiro in 1945. Stricken from the naval register on 2 August 1947, the ship remained as a training vessel until August 1951, when it was sold to the Iron and Steel Corporation of Great Britain for breaking up at a cost of 18,810,000 cruzeiros.

=== Sinking ===
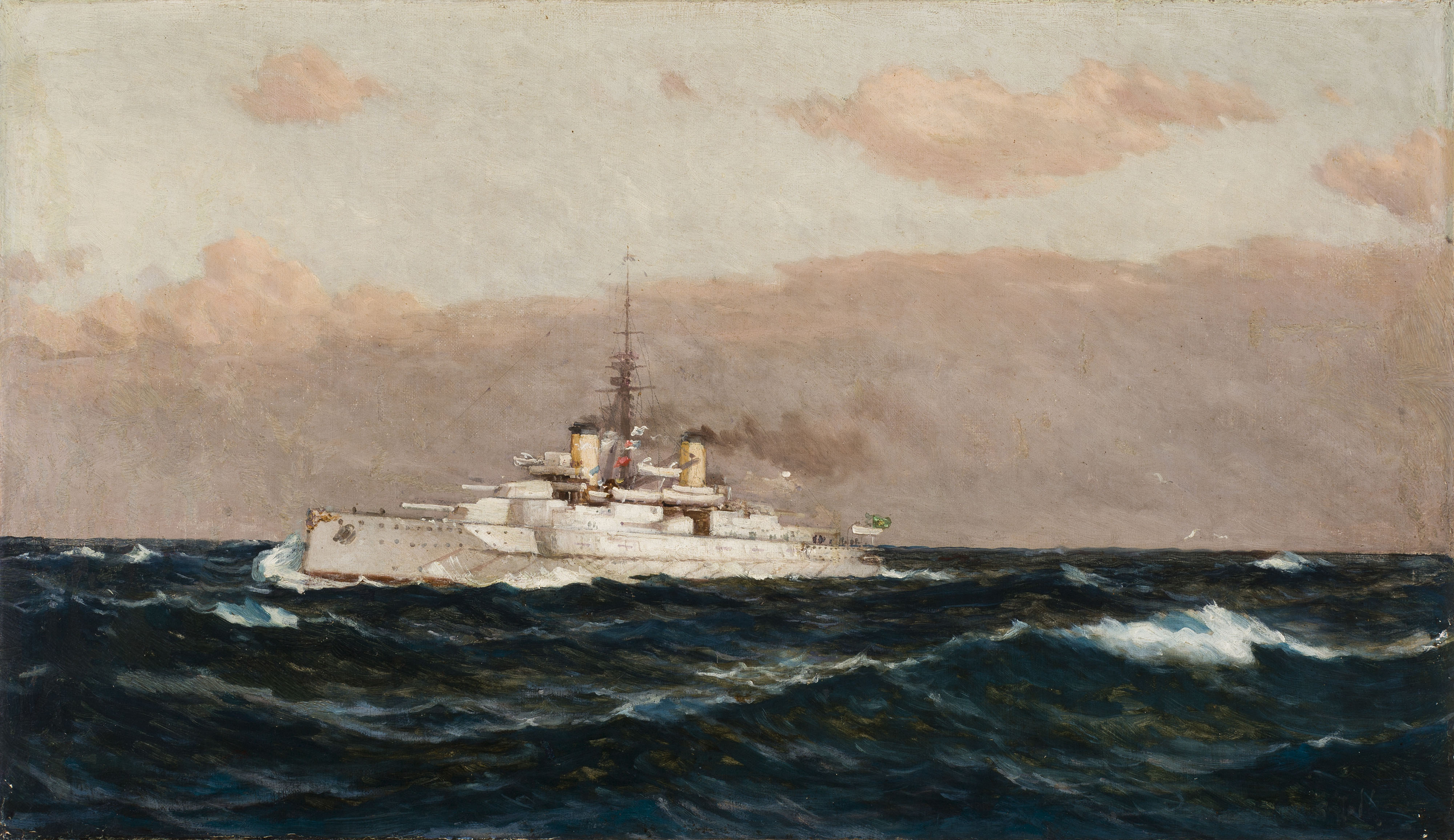
São Paulo as painted by Edoardo De Martino

After preparing from 5 to 18 September 1951, São Paulo was given an eight-man caretaker crew and taken under tow by two tugs, Dexterous and Bustler, departing Rio de Janeiro on 20 September 1951 for a final voyage to the scrappers. When north of the Azores in early November, the flotilla ran into heavy storm seas.

At 17:30 UTC on 4 or 6 November, (Note: Whitley and the Brazilian histories give 6 November, but contemporary newspaper accounts of the sinking and the Board of Trade report use 4 November.) the sea state caused São Paulo to pull sharply to starboard and fall into the trough between high waves. The action dragged the tugs astern and toward each other. To avoid a collision, Dexterous severed its cable and steered away, as had been previously agreed; however, the battleship's weight fell so heavily and abruptly onto Bustler's towing winch that it could not take in the slack—the tow cable became fouled in the tug's propeller and parted. The now drifting São Paulo's port (red) navigation light was visible for several minutes before it disappeared. American B-17 Flying Fortress bombers and British planes were launched to scout the Atlantic for the missing ship; it was reported, incorrectly, as found on 15 November. The search was ended on 10 December without finding São Paulo or its crew.

On 14 October 1954, the Board of Trade in London released its report on the circumstances and causes for the loss of the ship. The Board concluded that once both tow cables had parted, the São Paulo would have foundered or capsized within the hour, very near its last sighted position. The Board determined that the São Paulo sank at about 17:45 on 4 November 1951, at position 30°49′N 23°30′W.

== See also ==
- List of historical ships of the Brazilian Navy
