= Brazilian Navy =

Naval warfare branch of Brazil's military forces

- Marinha do Brasil
- Logo
- Founded: 1822; 204 years ago
- Country: Brazil
- Size: 77,216 personnel (2026), (incl. 16,000 marines); 76 aircraft (2022), see list
- Part of: Brazilian Armed Forces
- Headquarters: Brasília
- Patron: Marquess of Tamandaré
- Mottos: Protegendo nossas riquezas, cuidando da nossa gente ("Protecting our riches, caring for our people")
- March: Cisne Branco ("White Swan")
- Anniversaries: June 11 (Battle of Riachuelo)
- Ships: See list
- Engagements: See Military history of Brazil and History of the Brazilian Navy
- Website: www.marinha.mil.br

Commanders
- Commander-in-chief: Lula da Silva
- Minister of Defense: José Múcio
- Navy Commander: Marcos Olsen

Insignia
- Ensign

- Jack

- Flag

- Emblem

The Brazilian Navy (Portuguese: Marinha do Brasil, IPA: [maˈɾĩj̃ɐ du bɾaˈziw], MB) is the naval and coast guard service branch of Brazil's Armed Forces as well as its maritime authority. It has defense, management and constabulary roles in Brazilian jurisdictional waters and broader missions in the South Atlantic. Its naval, aviation and marine assets are spread between a combat Fleet (the Esquadra) based at Rio de Janeiro state and auxiliary and patrol assets along the coast and the Amazon and Platine basins.

The 19th century Imperial navy, organized from a section of the Portuguese Navy and influenced by the Royal Navy, was key to the Brazilian state's consolidation and foreign policy in the Platine region. By 1870, it was the world's fifth largest navy. However, the late century Republican coup and naval revolts downgraded its position relative to the Army. Its main rival was still the Argentine Navy, but German submarines were the enemy in both world wars. The Cold War fleet was an anti-submarine force under strong influence from the United States Navy until it sought greater independence and diversified capabilities. Over its history, its largest ships were the Minas Gerais-class battleships and the aircraft carriers Minas Gerais and São Paulo. (Note: For the Navy's history, see Paula 2004 for the Empire, Cascardo 2005 for tenentism, Alves 2005, Martins 2009, Martins 2010, Moura 2015, Val 2013 and Waldmann 2019, for the fleet's evolution over the 20th century, Assis 2013 and Bonalume 2021 for World War II, Almeida 2010 for the 1964 revolt, Martins 2006, Moura 2014 and Pivatto 2024 for post-Cold War strategy and Cabral 2022, Salles & Galante 2023 and Vidigal 1983 for an overview.)

Historical fleet composition mixes imports from the United States and Western Europe with the work of local shipyards. The current fleet can be classed as a green-water navy, with some limited power projection capability. It has a flagship helicopter carrier, the Atlântico (A-140), (Note: Brazilian naval vocabulary calls aircraft carriers navios-aeródromo (NAe), lit. 'aerodrome ships'. The Atlântico was originally designated a multipurpose helicopter carrier and later a multipurpose navio-aeródromo to emphasize its ability to receive not just helicopters but also unmanned aerial vehicles and turboprop vertical landing aircraft. However, Brazil has none of the latter type of aircraft. With the name change, the Navy once again has an "aircraft carrier", but remains without any fixed-wing embarked aviation.) frigates, diesel-electric submarines, landing ships, an expeditionary brigade of marines and aviation squadrons (mostly helicopters). (Note: For an overview of the current fleet, see IISS 2025 and Salles & Galante 2023.) Long-term ambitions include a nuclear submarine. (Note: For the nuclear submarine project, see Kassenova 2014, Martins 2011 and Sá 2015.)

Within Brazilian society, the Navy seeks attention and funding by attempting to include maritime spaces, which it calls the "Blue Amazon", within national identity. (Note: For geopolitical thought on the South Atlantic and the organization of jurisdictional waters, see Carvalho 2019, Costa 2017, Maia 2020, Silva 2020a, Silva 2020b and Ventura 2020.) Compared to the Army, it has a greater focus on external defense and a much lower dependence on conscription. Relations between officers and enlisted men were the point of two seamen's mutinies in 1910 and 1964. Contacts are made with the scientific community, among them the nuclear and antarctic programas, continental shelf delimitation and occupation of the Trindade and Saint Peter and Saint Paul archipelagoes to include them in the exclusive economic zone.

== Role ==
The Navy, Army and Air Force make up the Brazilian Armed Forces, "permanent and regular national institutions, organized on the basis of hierarchy and discipline, under the supreme authority of the President", intended, in the words of the Constitution, for the "defense of the Fatherland, guarantee of constitutional powers and, at the initiative of any of them, of law and order".

The Navy's particular role is the preparation of employment of naval power i.e. naval, aviation and marine assets and their bases and command, logistical and administrative structures, along with Army and Air Force assets assigned to naval operations. Naval power has four basic tasks under Brazilian doctrine: sea control, sea denial, power projection over land and deterrence. Sea control and power projection over land are the prevailing tasks in Brazilian naval history. The 2008 National Defense Strategy proposed a novel priority in sea denial. Naval power is the military component of maritime power, which includes the merchant marine, port infrastructure, shipbuilding, resource extraction and other national activities at sea. The Brazilian merchant marine serves as a reserve to the Navy and may be mobilized in wartime.

Mentions to constitutional powers and law and order have echoes in almost all previous constitutions and roots in the military's history of involvement in politics and internal conflicts. In the current legal order, political authorities may call on the Armed Forces for law and order operations. The Navy's first widely reported participation in these missions was in the 2010 operations in Rio de Janeiro's favelas. However, compared to the Army it is more concerned with external defense than internal security. (Note: In its definition of the "Armed Forces as a permanent instrument of national foreign policy, the Navy makes it unnecessary to justify the existence of those forces with resource to any activity other than national defense, such as internal defense or revolutionary war". "While the former [the Navy] conceives of its mission as essentially related to defense proper, the latter [Army] understands its mission as transcending strictly military considerations, which implies assigning high weight to immaterial values such as the diffusion of civic sentiment and national presence". "Given its "blue-water" bias, the navy is even less inclined to become involved in counterdrug operations than the army or air force".) The image it seeks is that of a more professional service branch, which fights on internal military conflicts, when it fights, on the government's side. (Note: Under the Empire, the Navy "came to play an important role in the process of internal control of political violence", as a "key instrument to ensure the establishment and integrity of the complex machinery of state". The 1985 edition of the official Brazilian naval History stresses that the participation in 1920s and 1930s military revolts, which were mostly led by the Army, "was always overwhelmingly loyalist, in accordance with the conservative spirit peculiar to navies".)

=== Subsidiary roles ===
Brazilian legislation also provides subsidiary roles for the military: to contribute towards national development and civil defense and prevent and repress crimes in the land border and at sea. The Navy's Commander is designated as the country's "Maritime Authority" to exert the service's particular subsidiary roles:

1. Oversee and control the Merchant Marine and related activities in what concerns to national defense;
2. Provide safety in waterway navigation;
3. Contribute in the writing and implementation of national policies concerning the sea;
4. Implement and police laws and regulations at sea and inner waters, in coordination with other bodies of the executive power, federal or state, when necessary, given specific competences;
5. Cooperate with federal bodies, when necessary, in the repression of crimes of national or international repercussion on the use of the sea, inner waters and prot areas, in the form of logistical support, intelligence, communications and instruction.

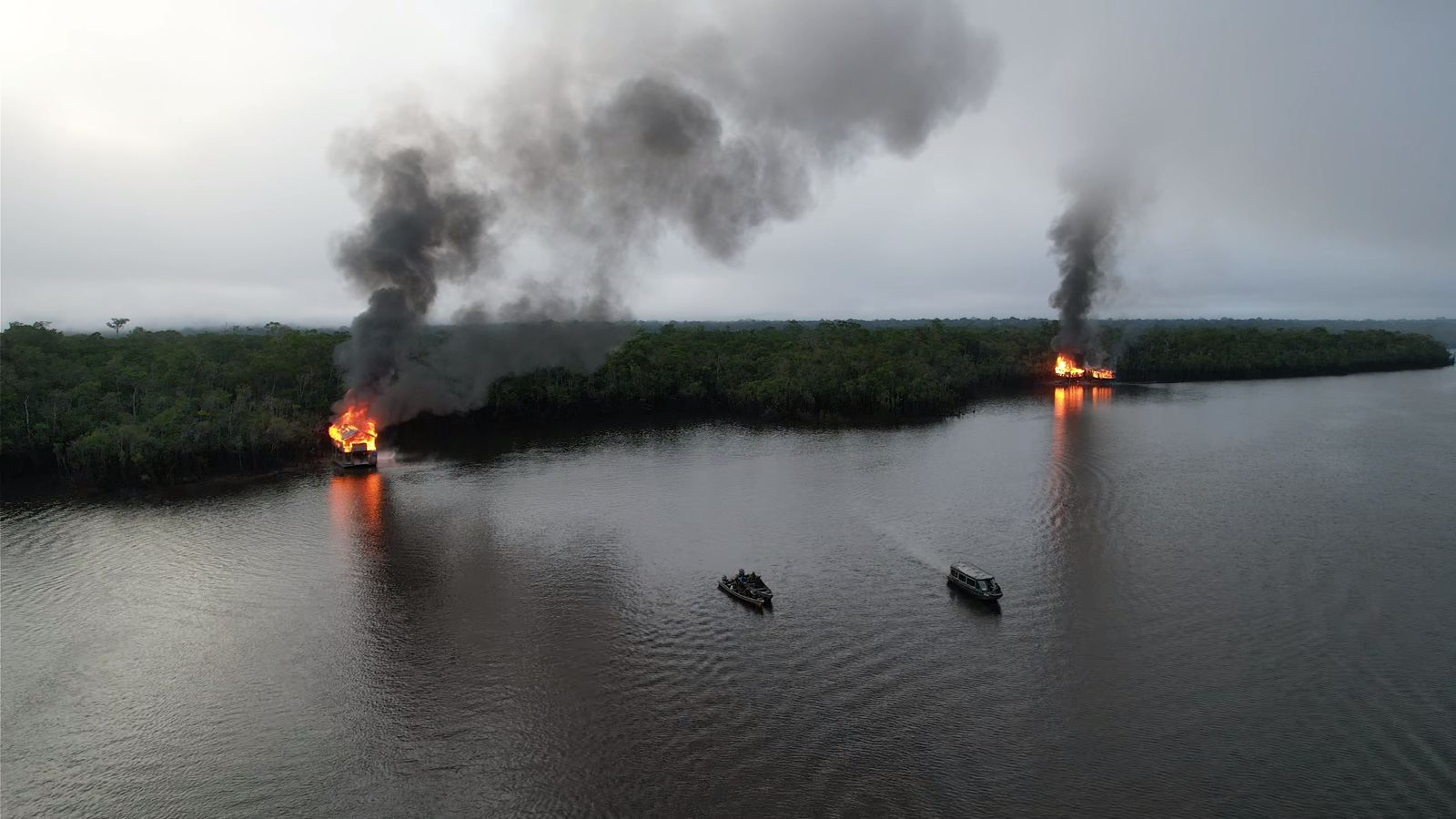
Destruction of dredges found in an operation against illegal mining in Amazonas

The Navy's role is management and not just defense of Brazilian waters. Its commander presides the Interministerial Commission on Marine Resources (CIRM), the coordenating body in the Brazilian government's maritime development strategy. The Maritime Authority Regulations and Normative Rulings enacted by the Navy are competent to fill gaps in Brazilian maritime legislation. This legal framework is enforced by the Navy across Brazilian jurisdictional waters i.e. waterways and inner waters, the territorial sea, exclusive economic zone (EEZ) and waters overlying the extended continental shelf.

For this purpose, naval assets are used in patrol and inspection operations, not to be confused with sea control, a distinctly military operation. Naval patrol wields limited force against smuggling, arms or drug trafficking, unauthorized fishing, terrorism, piracy and other crimes. Naval inspection refrains from the use of force and seeks to safeguard human life and navigation safety and prevent pollution. In these activities, the Navy's opponents may include bad fishermen, drunk recreational boaters and owners of boats which do not comply with security norms. Crewmen board vessels to check documents, mandatory equipment, repairs and damages. Foreign ships are subject to port state control to verify their compliance with international conventions.

This opens some overlap in tasks with the Federal Police, which has a maritime service for port zones, waterways and maritime accesses to critical points of the coast. On environmental enforcement, tasks may possibly overlap with those of the Institute of Environment and Renewable Natural Resources (IBAMA). Execution of subsidiary roles demands contact with the Federal Police, IBAMA, National Water Transport Agency (ANTAQ), Chico Mendes Institute for Biodiversity Conservation (ICMBio) and Department of Federal Revenue. Regulations enacted by the Navy are related to regulations by other government agencies in fields such as transport, infrastructure and the environment, as well as those of international agencies such as the International Maritime Organization. And as the Maritime Authority, the Commander of the Navy represents Brazil in international fora addressing issues covered by the service's subsidiary roles.

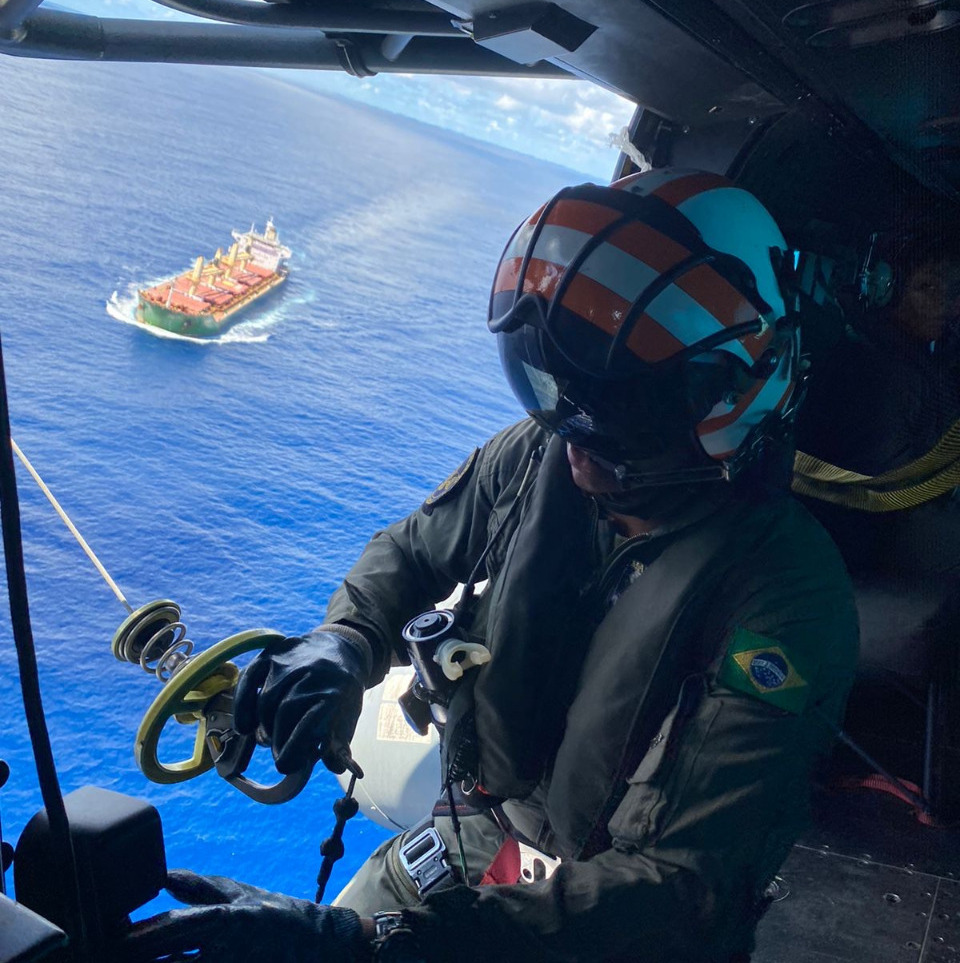
Aeromedical evacuation on a merchant ship in Brazilian waters

In its role in waterway safety, the Navy operates buoys, beacons, lighthouses, weather stations and communications centers, conducts hydrographic surveys and enforces the Waterway Traffic Safety Law through its patrols and inspections. Out of 206 lighthouses present on the Brazilian coast in 2022, 199 were operated by the Navy. Navigation incidents are reported to the Admiralty Court (Tribunal Marítimo). The Navy is also a port authority, controls professional maritime and port education and runs the merchant marine officer academy.

To comply with Brazil's commitments in the International Convention for the Safety of Life at Sea, the Navy and Air Force have a search and rescue role in an area extending as far as the 10th parallel west, over more than 14 million square kilometers of the Atlantic. And there are other humanitarian roles and civic-social actions, such as medical aid to riverine populations in the Amazon and Pantanal.

=== Coast guard ===
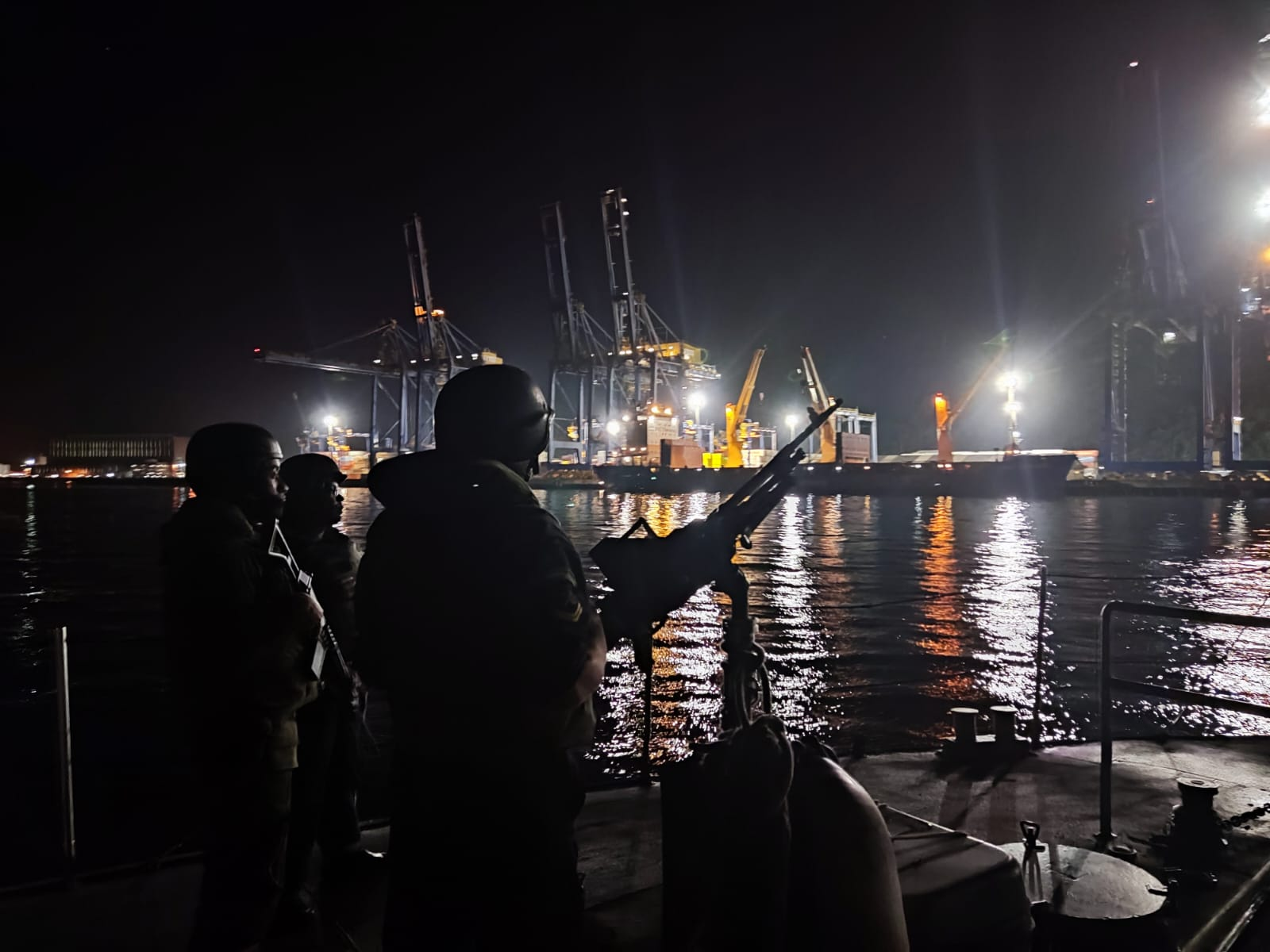
Marines in a law and order operation at a port area

Patrol and inspection, sea rescue and waterway safety are typical roles for a coast guard. Brazil has no such agency and the Navy assumes the roles it would have. It describes itself as a "dual navy", fit for both warfare and coastal and riverine policing. There have been proposals for a separate Brazilian coast guard, of which the latest effort of note was attempted by Minister of the Navy Maximiano da Fonseca in 1983. A bill would create a federal autonomous agency linked to the Navy and controlled in wartime as a reserve force. It would assume all subsidiary roles and the personnel and materiel inventory of the Directorate of Ports and Coasts, which would then be disbanded. The proposal was highly unpopular in the Navy and none of his successors revisited the idea. Congress shelved the bill. In the early 2000s, the Federal Police's intelligence sector also recommended the creation of a coast guard.

A coast guard would relieve the Navy of its long list of non-military roles to focus on naval warfare and potentially reduce crime in coastal regions, which the Navy has not managed to fully contain. This has already pressed several state police forces to create maritime security companies. On the other hand, its opponents argue the new agency would have enormous disputes with the Navy over the split of its properties, areas, resources and roles. Combat and patrol assets and their human and logistical inventories are currently shared and their separation would be costlier than the current model. The new agency would in time be fully removed from the Navy's control, fight over its scarce resources and achieve a higher priority, as its services would be closer to society. According to Admiral Armando Vidigal, "the US Navy need not fear competition from a Coast Guard, which wouldn't be the case in Brazil". There are institutional interests at play: without its coast guard roles, the Navy would lose revenue from fares and port services and a reason for its existence.

=== Science and technology ===
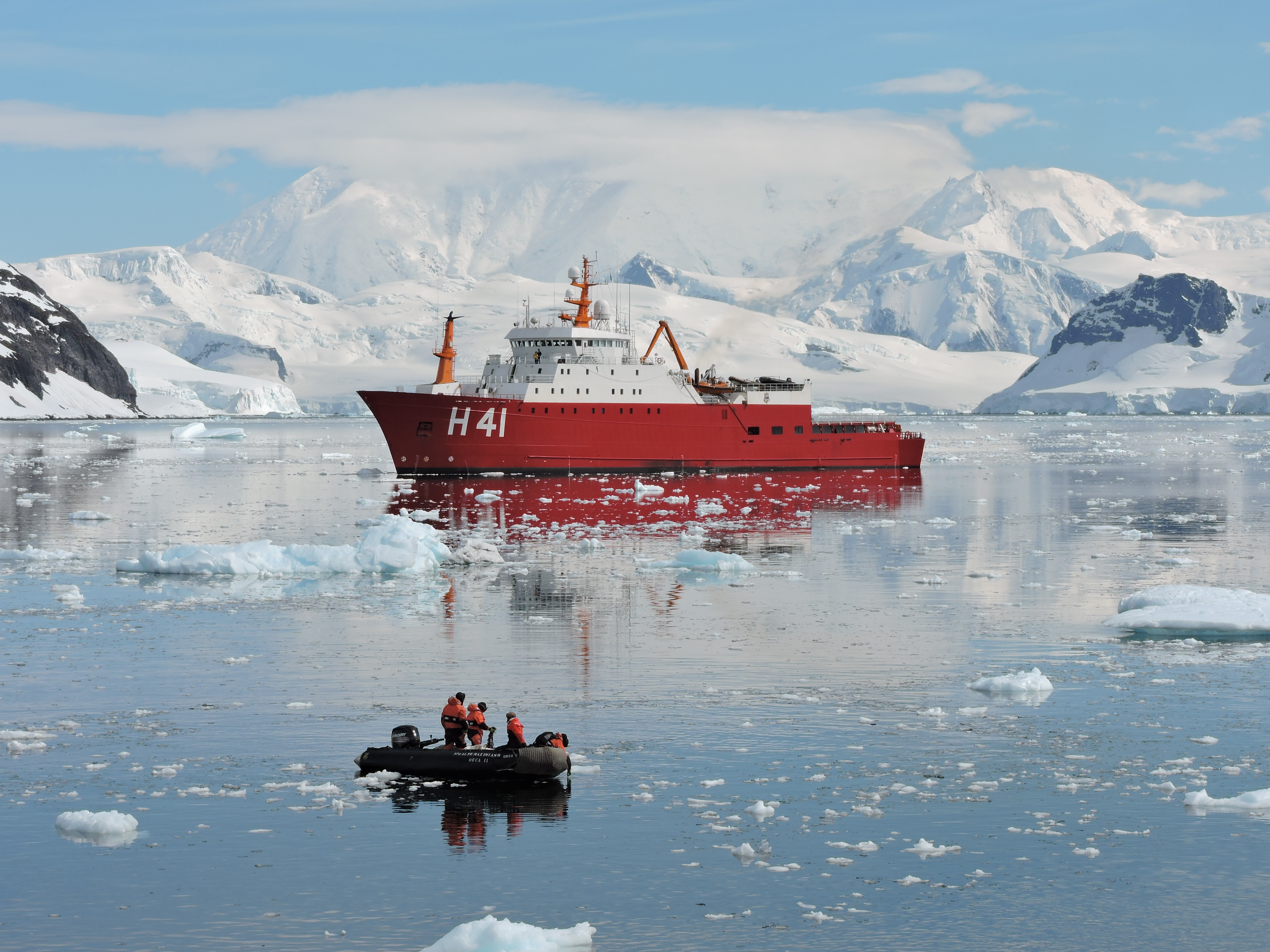
Polar ship Almirante Maximiano (H-41) in the Antarctic Program

Wide contact is kept with the scientific community in areas such as nuclear energy, Antarctic exploration and, historically, the computer industry. Continental shelf extension claims are based on the Brazilian Continental Shelf Survey Plan (LEPLAC), a joint effort between the Navy, Petrobras and the scientific community, created in 1989. Uranium enrichment ultracentrifuges at the Resende Nuclear Fuel Factory are provided by the Navy's nuclear program.

Naval logistics supply scientific bases on the remote archipelagoes of Trindade and Saint Peter and Saint Paul for the explicit purpose of having them count as "inhabited islands" with an outlying EEZ. The latter archipelago is a barely livable outpost. Four-person crews are rotated in half-month intervals, with a ship always on standby for an emergency. The Comandante Ferraz Antarctic Station and the Brazilian Antarctic Program's logistics are also run by the Navy. The earliest naval expeditions to the continent enabled Brazil to receive consultative status in the Antarctic Treaty System in 1983.

== Area of operations ==
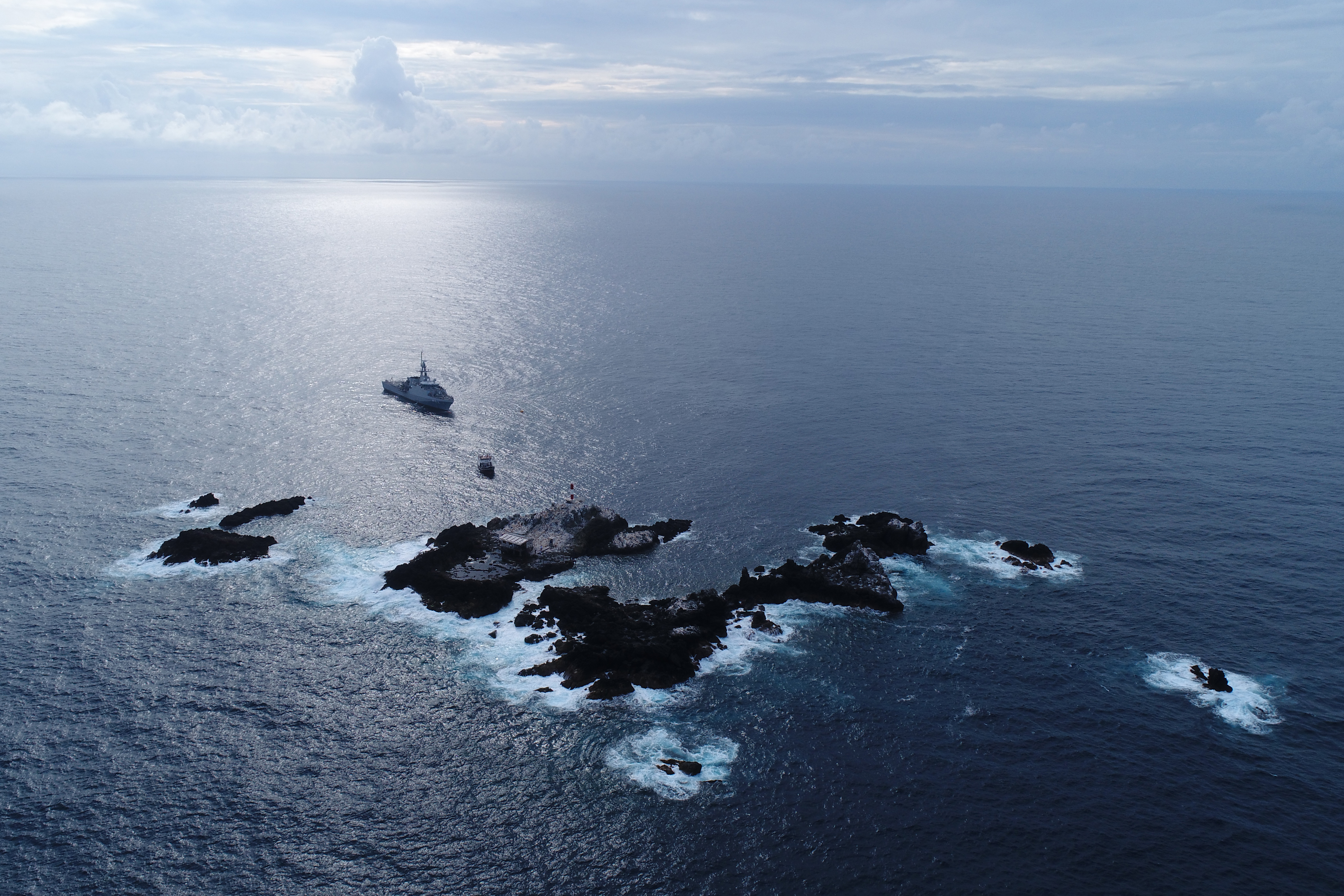
Research station and offshore patrol vessel Araguari (P-122) at the Saint Peter and Saint Paul Archipelago

The Brazilian Navy is traditionally considered a coastal force, with a significant presence also in rivers ("brown" waters). Long-term aims would make it a blue-water navy, capable of distant overseas expeditions. In its current state, which falls short of this level, can be classed as that of a green-water navy, focused on the defense of its jurisdictional waters. Most of its naval assets, particularly larger ships, are concentrated in the state of Rio de Janeiro, the "backbone" of the Navy, where the fleet is headquartered. There is a proposal for a 2nd Fleet based in the North or Northeast of the country. Aside from this main component, patrol and auxiliary craft are based at several points in the coast and Amazonas and Paraguay rivers.

The Brazilian government's National Defense Strategy prioritizes sea control in the stretch of coastline between Santos and Vitória and in the Amazon Delta. The 2023 Maritime Defense Strategy also mentioned as "maritime areas of interest" the Rio Grande Rise, the surroundings of oceanic islands and the Campos and Santos oil and gas basins. "The strategic maritime areas of greatest priority and importance for Brazil", according to the 2012 National Defense White Paper, are the jurisdictional waters, "as well as the region between the 16th parallel north, the west coast of Africa, Antarctica, eastern South America and the eastern Lesser Antilles." This is what military thinkers have called the "Brazilian strategic contour" (entorno estratégico brasileiro), where interventions on behalf of national interests may be needed. United Nations peacekeeping operations may demand power projection even further away from the coast.

=== International relations ===
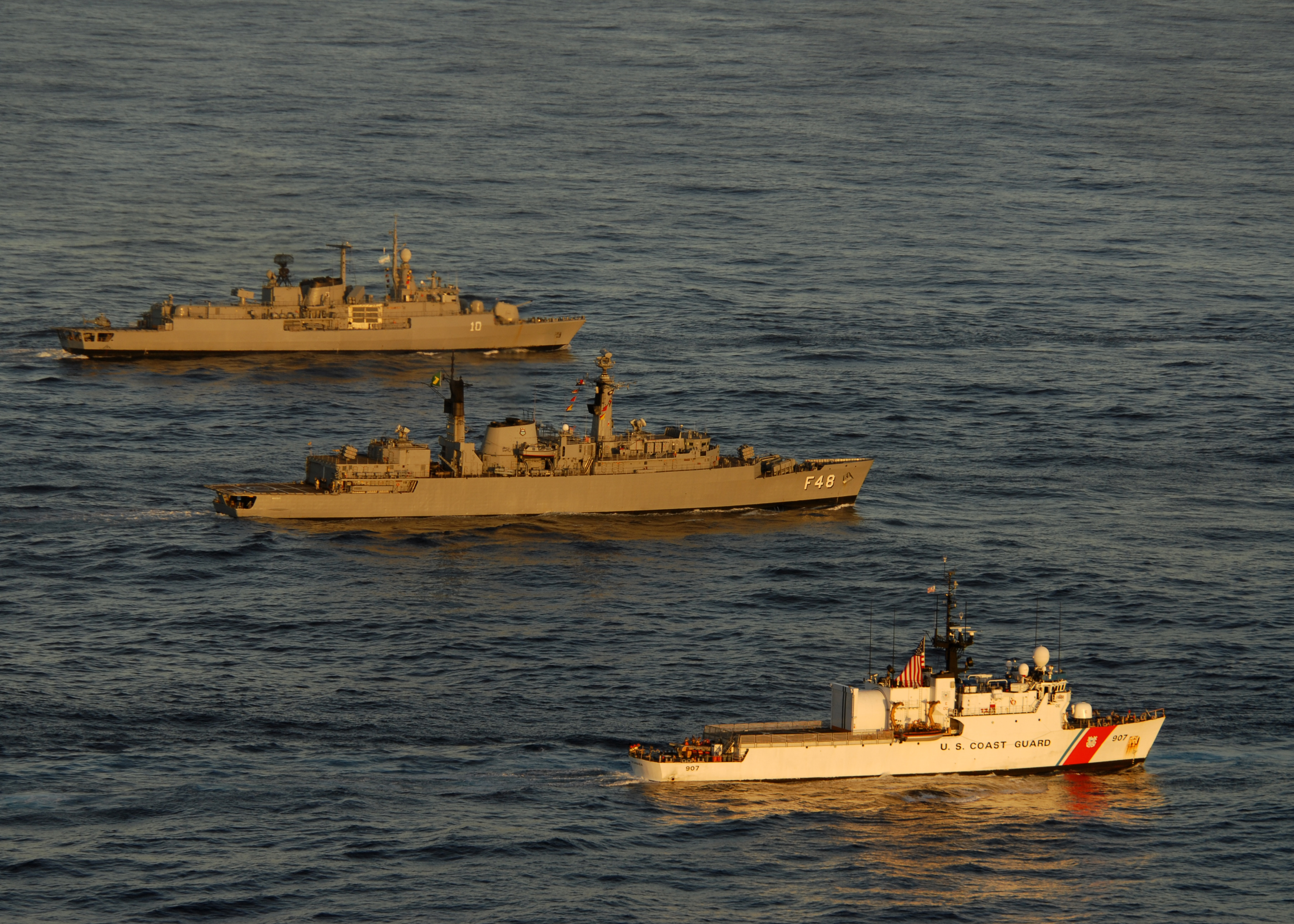
Brazilian frigate Bosísio (F-48) (centered) between an Argentine destroyer and a United States Coast Guard cutter

Brazil's historical rival in the 19th and 20th centuries was Argentina. The balance of naval power in South America centered on the ABC powers (Argentina, Brazil and Chile). The chief external influence in doctrine and traditions, from the earliest years, was the British Royal Navy. American influence began to take over once an advisory mission was hired in 1922. Germany was the opponent in both world wars; the second war confirmed American influence through Lend-Lease transfers and joint operations. The postwar military assistance treaty with the United States raised this influence to its all-time high. (Note: Likewise, the Brazilian Marine Corps, traditionally modelled after the Brazilian Army, sought inspiration in the United States Marine Corps.) The United States assumed leadership of a collective defense system for the Western Hemisphere, formalized in the Organization of American States and Inter-American Treaty of Reciprocal Assistance, against an implicit enemy: the Soviet Union. Joint operations (Unitas, Veritas and Springboard) promoted American tactical patterns in Latin American navies.

1970s naval planning reappraised threats. The greatest concern was now a regional, not global war. Brazil withdrew from its military treaty with the United States and dismissed the advisory mission. (Note: This did not meant a disruption in relations between the US and Brazilian navies. The end of the treaty was a foreign policy decision by Ernesto Geisel's government.) Relations with Argentina were pacified, and in time evolved into regular bilateral exercises such as Operation Fraterno. Influence was sought in Africa and most notably achieved in Namibia in the 1990s. (Note: From the 1980s onwards, Brazilian warships visited ports in the African Atlantic coast and officers from African navies were invited to Brazilian academies. Newly-independent Namibia sought a Brazilian advisory mission for its Navy in 1992.) After the end of the Cold War and the Soviet Union's disappearance, Brazilian naval thought replaced its "conflict hypotheses" with "strategic vulnerabilities" for an unpredictable world. Nonstate threats such as terrorism emerge. Brazil's official defense strategy names no specific enemy which must be deterred or resisted against, and it is precisely the lack of a perceived threat which disinterests the public in naval investments.

The ambition is to be perceived as the leading naval power in the South Atlantic, if not the Southern Hemisphere. Expensive projects for nuclear submarines and aircraft carriers may stand out in early 21st century South America, a mostly stable region on interstate relations. But they are easier to understand when factoring in ambitions of global power: a power projection capability would bolster the bid for a permanent seat in the United Nations Security Council. On the other hand, the 1988 Constitution establishes non-intervention as a guideline of Brazil's foreign policy, which does not favor the idea of a strong navy.

For coastal states in the South Atlantic, what the Brazilian government proposes is a common identity and agenda and a rejection of extraregional military presence. This presence does exist, such as the string of British overseas territories from Ascension Island to the Falkland Islands. Brazilian representatives have criticized North Atlantic Treaty Organization (NATO) operations in the South Atlantic at the same time as the Brazilian military maintains partnerships with NATO countries. Relations between the Brazilian and US navies are still colored by their long history together. The 21st century Brazilian Navy remains a westernized institution in the sourcing of its ships and its tactics, procedures and uniforms.

=== "Maritime mentality" ===
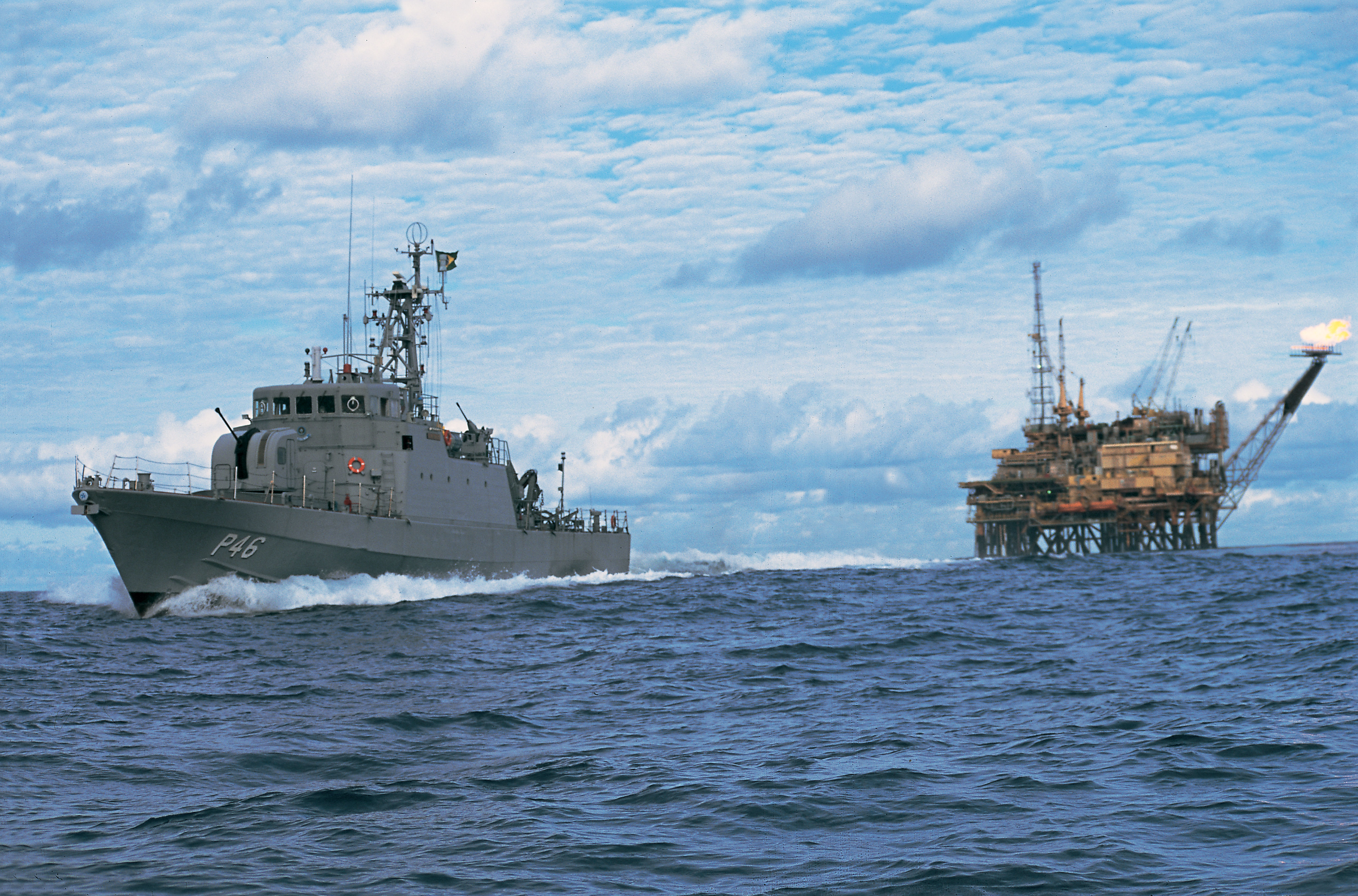
Grajaú-class patrol boat next to an offshore oil platform

The Portuguese Empire's conquest and colonization of what would come to be Brazil began from the sea. As a result, independent Brazil in the 19th century was an "archipelagic" state, with its population concentrated along the coast and navigable rivers, as in Mato Grosso. The merchant marine and shipbuilding were significant economic sectors and the population's geographic imagination was centered on the sea — everything converged to make naval power relevant. In the 20th century, on the contrary, policies and the collective consciousness faced the continental interior, as can be seen in the transfer of the capital from Rio de Janeiro to Brasília, the March to the West and the replacement of coastal navigation by the highway network as the primary mode of transportation.

And yet the sea has not ceased to be relevant. Around 80% of the Brazilian population still lived at less than 200 kilometers from the coast, in data from 2020, and 95% of external trade crossed the sea. Economic activities and energy resources concentrate near the coast: offshore oil extraction exceeded production on land in 1982 and made up 95% of total production in 2018. The numbers are similar for natural gas. In 2024, Brazil was the world's 9th largest oil producer. As of 2015, an estimated 18.93% of the gross domestic product (GDP) was directly or indirectly tied to the sea.

Brazilian naval thinkers deplore the loss of "maritime mentality" among the population. Opinion polls evidence the Brazilian public is largely ignorant of the sea's economic and legal aspects, and in 2014, although 60% agreed the Navy was relevant to the nation, 90% could not cite examples of what it did. The CIRM coordinates the Maritime Mentality Promotion Program (Promar), which seeks to create a maritime identity within the Brazilian collective consciousness.

=== Blue Amazon ===
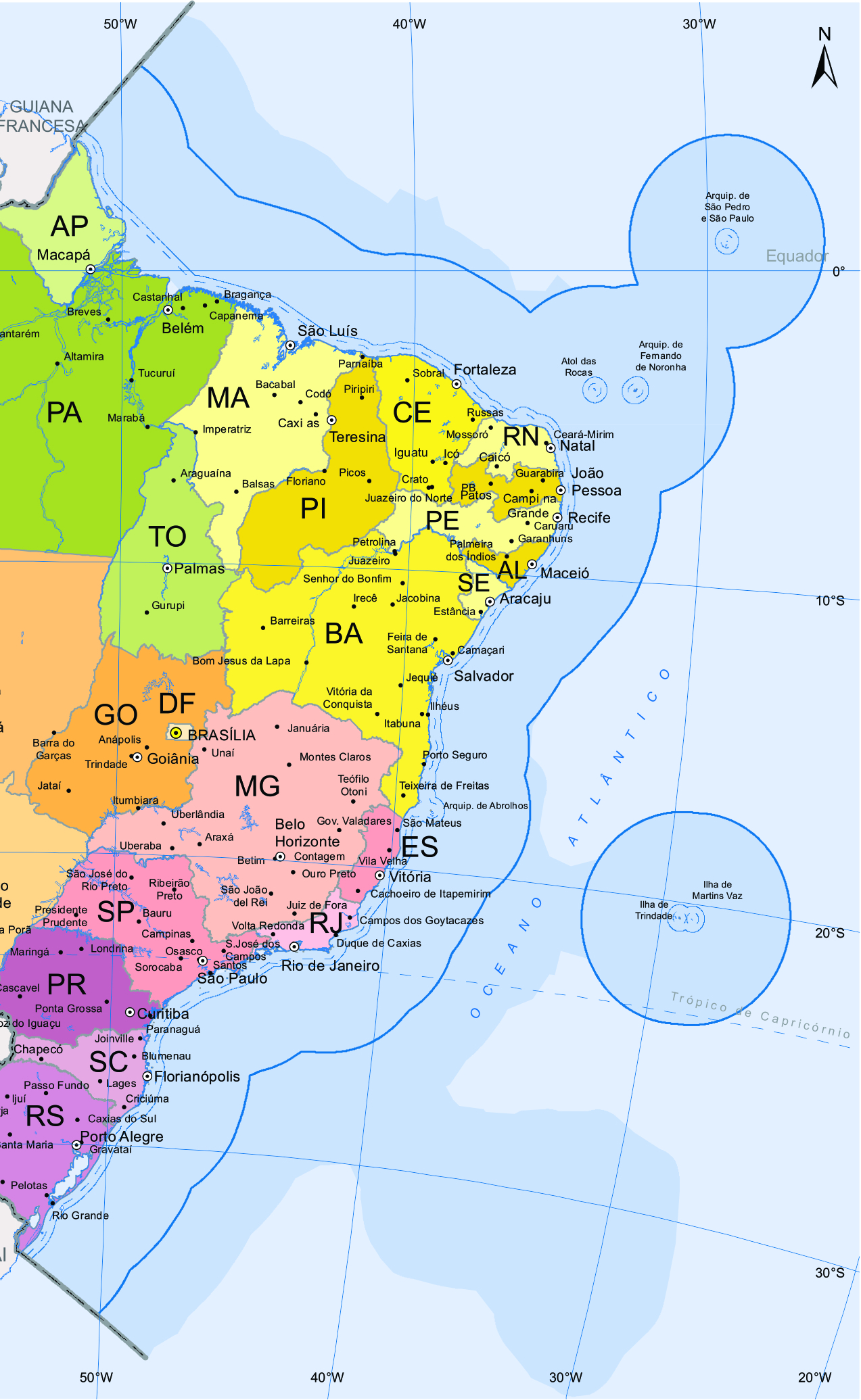
Map of Brazil outlining the territorial sea (dotted line), EEZ (dark blue line) and continental shelf (darker, unmarked blue)

As a party to the United Nations Convention on the Law of the Sea (UNCLOS), Brazil is entitled to an EEZ at distance of up to 200 nautical miles (370 kilometres) from its coastline, replacing earlier claims (1970–1993) of a 200-nautical mile territorial sea. Three archipelagoes, Fernando de Noronha, Trindade and Saint Peter and Saint Paul, and Rocas Atoll also radiate an EEZ from their contour. Trindade and Fernando de Noronha are potentially useful in a forward defense of the Brazilian coast, but currently have no defensive installations. UNCLOS also provided the basis for an extended continental shelf claim in 2004. The United Nations Commission on the Limits of the Continental Shelf (CLCS) has yet to approve the entire Brazilian claim. Adding together the EEZ and all continental shelf proposals, Brazil would have rights over a maritime area of 5.7 million square kilometers.

In 2004 the Navy created an overarching name for all maritime areas under any kind of Brazilian jurisdiction: "Blue Amazon". Since then, this term is ubiquitous in its external and internal communication and its very identity. Naval investments are explained in terms of the defense of the Blue Amazon, through which attention and public support for greater funding are sought. The name is a semantic device to appropriate a loaded word: the "green" Amazon is strongly tied in the Brazilian imagination to natural resources, biodiversity and environmental and national sovereignty issues. In this sense, the two Amazons are vast, rich and potentially threatened spaces.

Beyond trade and energy, the Brazilian maritime space has untapped potentials for several living and non-living resources and is of interest to scientific research and environmental conservation. Discourse on the Blue Amazon traces a direct logical connection between the existence of resources and the need for military presence in an area. Fears of foreign greed and calls for military investments, therefore, increased after the announcement of large oil reserves discovered in the South Atlantic's pre-salt layer in 2007. But regardless of what could cause a conflict, Brazil has geographic reasons, an eight-thousand kilometer coastline where its population and economy reside, to desire a forward naval defense. And the Navy has roles on international waters, which the concept of the Blue Amazon glosses over, which can unintentionally create an image of a constabulary navy with no sea power.

=== Internal waters ===
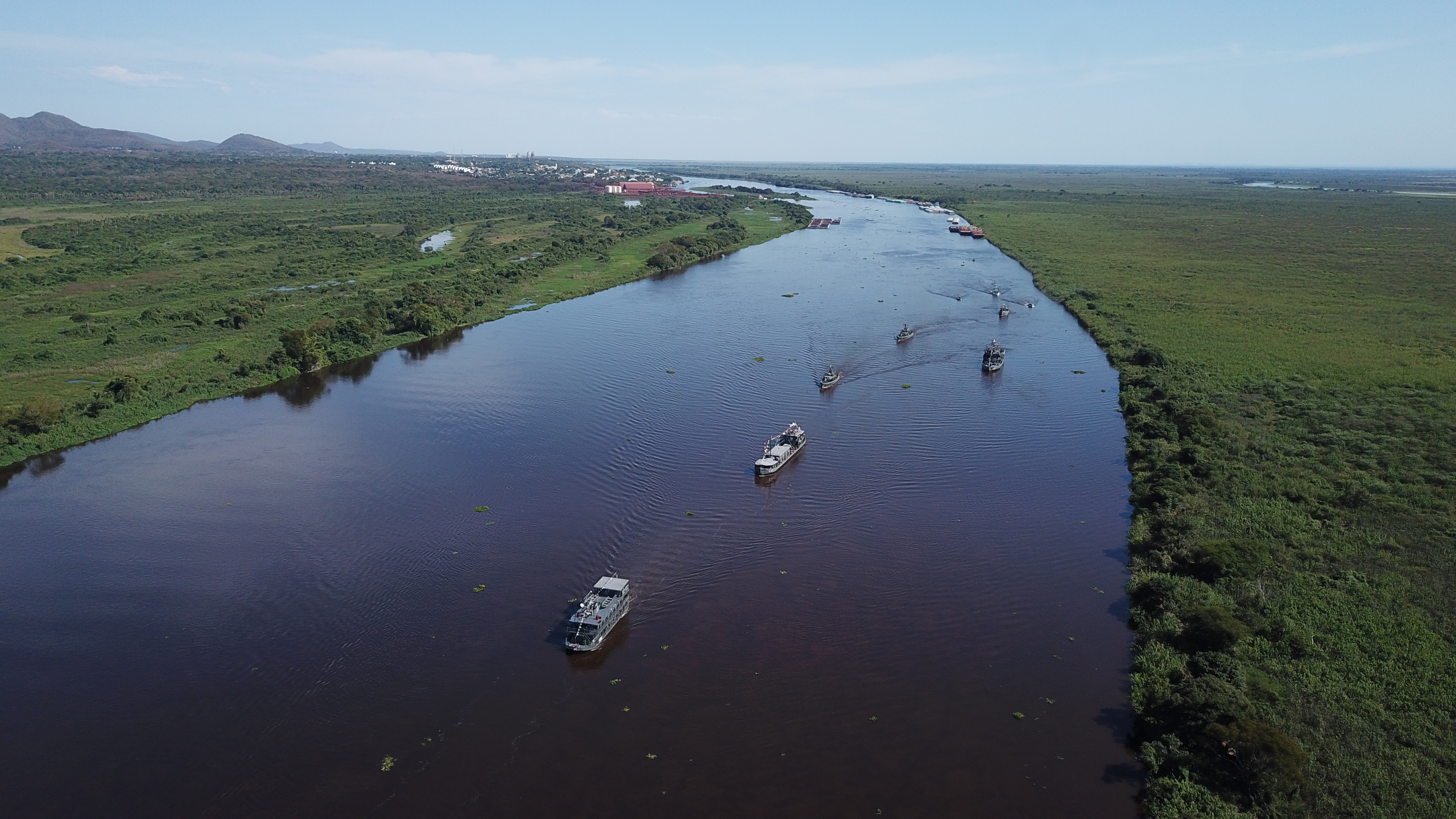
Mato Grosso Flotilla in the Paraguay River

The definitions of Blue Amazon and Brazilian jurisdictional waters include inner waterways. The National Defense Strategy called for greater investments in the Amazon and Paraguay-Paraná basins, to which the Navy traditionally assigns secondary importance. The service cares less abour the ("green") Amazon than the Army, but its most famous battles happened on rivers in the Platine basin in the 19th century.

Brazil's riverine spaces are vast. From the Atlantic, ships can reach Peru through the Amazon River, and Mato Grosso through the Paraguay River. In the Amazon, rivers are the primary mode of transportation in the absence of a comprehensive road network. Even the Army has a riverine logistics unit, the Amazon Military Command Boat Center. Brazil cooperates with Colombia and Peru, in the Amazon, and Bolivia, Paraguay, Argentina and Uruguay, in the Platine basin, against the drug trade and environmental crime.

== History ==
The Brazilian Navy is the oldest service branch in the Armed Forces, and as such, has formal precedence in official texts and ceremonies. Officially, it derives from the Portuguese Secretariat of State of the Navy and of the Overseas Affairs, created on July 28, 1736. Upon Brazilian independence in 1822, some of the institutions, ships and personnel of the Portuguese Navy in the Americas defected to the new state. The commanding body for this new institution was the Navy Ministry, whose first commander was appointed on October 28, 1822. In 1999 the Navy Ministry was downgraded to Navy Command, subordinate to the newly created Ministry of Defense.

The fleet's evolution over the 19th and 20th centuries followed cycles of roughly four decades of expansion and contraction. High points were achieved in 1830, 1870, 1910, 1945 and 1980. The 20th century Navy was a regional trend-setter as the first in Latin America to acquire dreadnought battleships, submarines and aircraft carriers.

=== 19th century ===
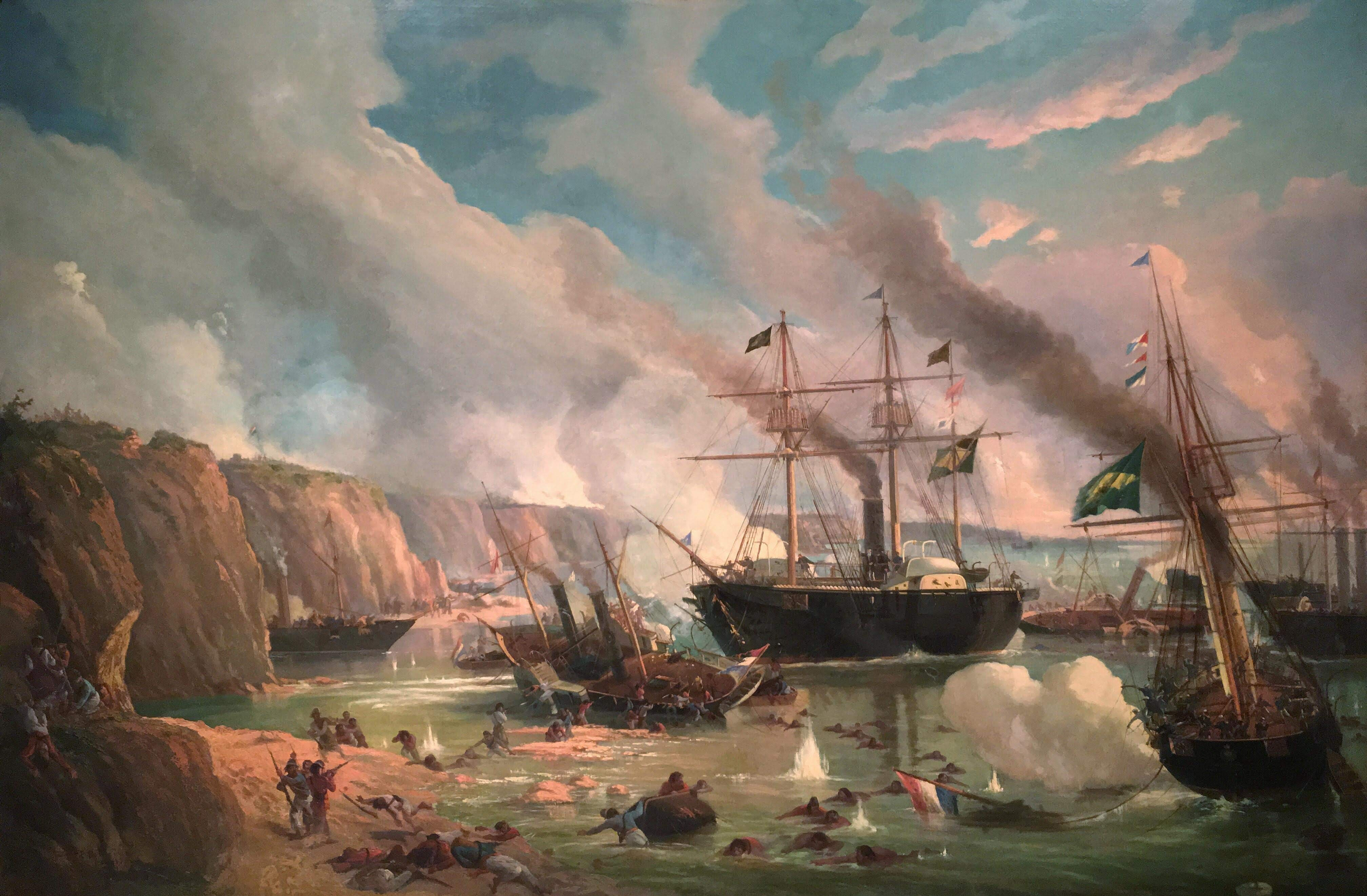
Battle of Riachuelo, decisive naval engagement of the War of the Triple Alliance in 1865

The Navy was actively used by the Brazilian Empire (1822–1889), transporting and supplying the army, cutting off enemy lines of communication through blockades and defending its own lines from enemy commerce raiding. The expulsion of remaining Portuguese forces from South America in the Brazilian War of Independence and quelling of internal revolts in the Regency period (1831–1840) conserved the integrity of the new state. Although only one rebellion had a naval force (the Riograndense Republic), naval logistics were decisive. The 1822 fleet was modest and had to be complemented with foreign mercenaries, such as the British veteran Thomas Cochrane, and ships bought in a national subscription. There was a local industry for wooden ships since the colonial period, although the artillery came from Europe. Rifled barrels and steamships were adopted in the 1830s and 1840s.

On interstate wars in the Platine basin (Cisplatine, 1825–1828, Platine, 1851–1852, and Triple Alliance, 1864–1870), successful naval campaigns were the foundation of Imperial foreign policy. The longest campaign, in 1860s Paraguay, was a slow ascent of the Paraná and Paraguay rivers in coordination with the Army, facing enemy artillery and boarding parties, diseases killing more than combat and maintenance difficulties. Notable engagements took place in Riachuelo, Curupayty and Humaitá. In 1870 the Brazilian Navy had grown to the world's fifth largest in ship numbers, although they were mostly wooden vessels for riverine warfare.

This cycle of conventional warfare ended in 1870, reducing political interest in naval power, at the same time as technological advancements no longer allowed an unindustrialized state to sustain a modern fleet on its own resources. By the end of the century, shipbuilding had all but ceased and Brazil was an importer of ships. The 1889 Proclamation of the Republic was the Army's initiative, having diverged in the social composition and ideological influences of its officer corps. (Note: The Army's newer generation was drawn from the lower middle class, while the Navy represented the upper middle class and aristocracy, lived a more sheltered existence and was not influenced by positivism.) Parts of the Navy launched two naval revolts against the first two presidents, in 1891 and 1893–1895. Their defeat left Brazilian naval power in profound decay by the turn of the century, while the Army grew in political strength and budget share. (Note: "[T]he Army made the Republic and conquered political power, while the Navy remained basically monarchist and assumed a position of inferiority. The 1893 Naval Revolt [...] ends symbolically and inexorably the Navy's period of political hegemony".) What was left of the fleet in 1899, two battleships, two coastal defense ships, four armored cruisers, five gunboats and thirteen torpedo boats, was inferior to the Argentine and Chilean navies.

=== World Wars ===
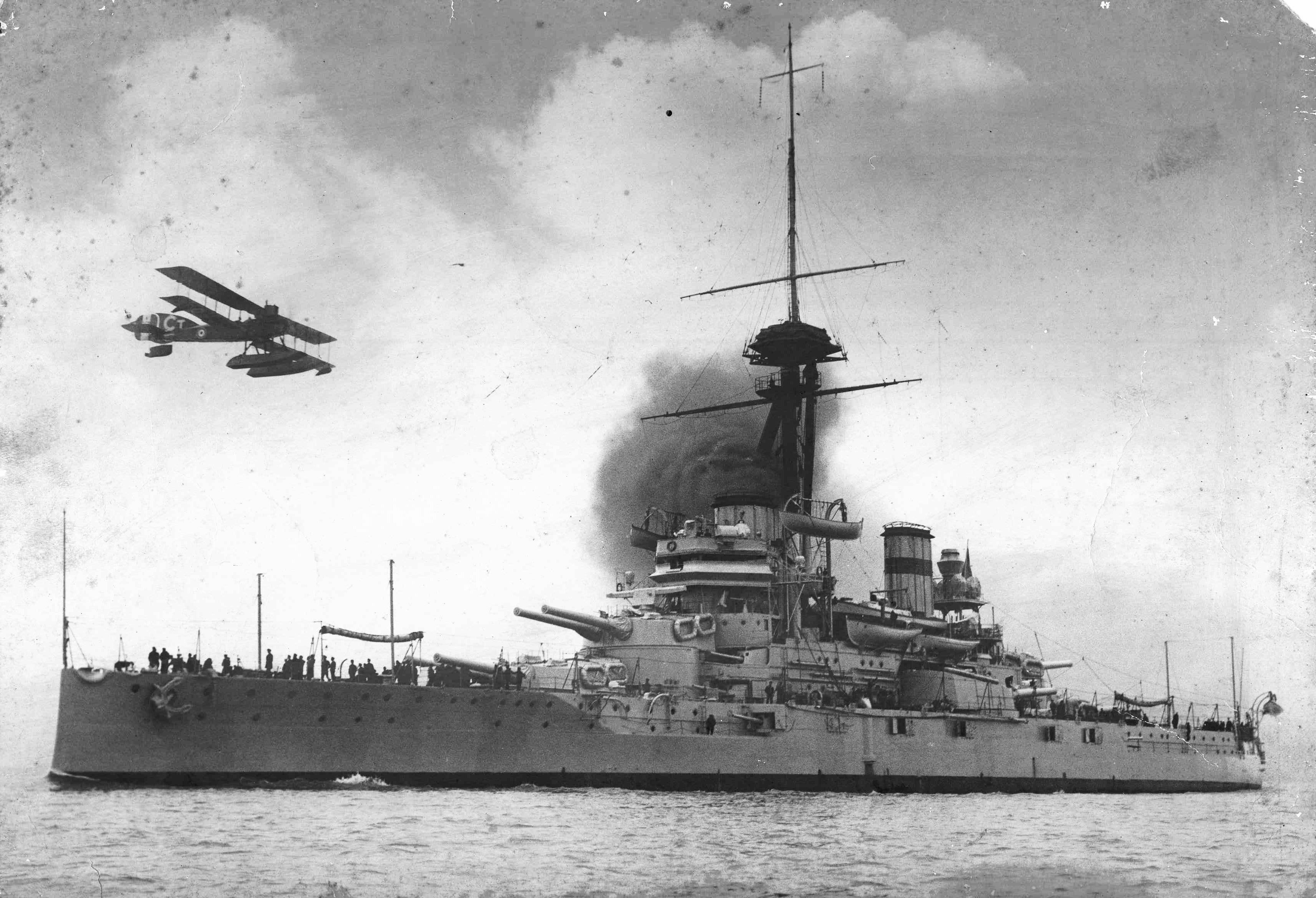
The dreadnought São Paulo, one of the two stars of the 1910 fleet, overflied by a Naval Aviation seaplane

Brazil entered the two world wars, in 1917–1918 and 1942–1945, with essentially the same navy: (Note: Only half of the Pará class was still in service and seaworthy in 1939, but there was one newer destroyer, the Maranhão. The first Foca-class submersibles had already been replaced.) the "1910 Fleet", composed of two Minas Gerais-class dreadnought battleships, two Bahia-class cruisers, ten Pará-class destroyers, three Foca-class submersibles and auxiliary vessels. It was ordered at British shipyards at the heights of the coffee and rubber booms, with the endorsement of the Minister of Foreign Affairs, the Baron of Rio Branco. Brazil never managed to make full use of the dreadnoughts' potential. It depended on foreign industry for their maintenance and the Navy's human resources were insufficiently professionalized. The latter came to light when seamen mutinied against the enduring practice of corporal punishment in the 1910 Revolt of the Lash. The order set off a naval arms race with Argentina and Chile and the 1910 fleet was quickly outmatched.

Investment was minimal in the interwar period, but there was a gradual professionalization. A Naval Aviation branch, created in 1916, was disbanded in 1941 upon the creation of the Brazilian Air Force. A modest naval program in 1932 revived shipbuilding, matching the wider industrializing policy of the Getúlio Vargas government. The Navy fought on the government's side during internal conflicts in the 1920s and 1930s, such as in the blockade of the Port of Santos during the Constitutionalist Revolution of 1932. On the other hand, parts of the Navy joined the tenentist and integralist insurrections. (Note: The fleet shelled Fort Copacabana in its 1922 revolt and landed in Santos during the 1924 São Paulo Revolt, but the battleship São Paulo and the Amazonas Flotilla joined revolts in 1924. In the Revolution of 1930, naval operations in the South and Northeast were insufficient to prevent the collapse of the government. In 1932, besides the coastal blockade, there were riverine and marine operations. The communist uprising of 1935 was of little relevance to the Navy, but a number of officers and enlisted men were arrested after the 1938 integralist uprising.) Naval tenentism was weaker than its counterpart in the Army, as the Navy had a better relationship with the civilian political elite. An admiral's participation in the 1930 military junta was a novelty, with the Navy and Army now taking power together.

In both world wars, the cause of Brazilian entry was the sinking of civilian shipping by German submarines. In both cases Brazil found itself unprepared for anti-submarine warfare and accepted operational subordination to a stronger power for a shipping defense campaign. In World War I, a naval division was prepared for operations in the West African coast at the orders of the British admiralty. In World War II, the Navy entered a joint Allied command headed by American forces based off Northeastern Brazil. Its task was to escort convoys between South America and the Caribbean. A total of 3,164 merchant ships were escorted, at the cost of three warships and 486 men lost at sea. American assistance through the Lend-Lease program, including eight destroyer escorts and 16 submarine chasers, created a modern anti-submarine force. With these small but radar- and sonar-equipped vessels, and larger ships under construction at the Navy Arsenal, Brazil approached parity with Argentina.

=== Cold War ===
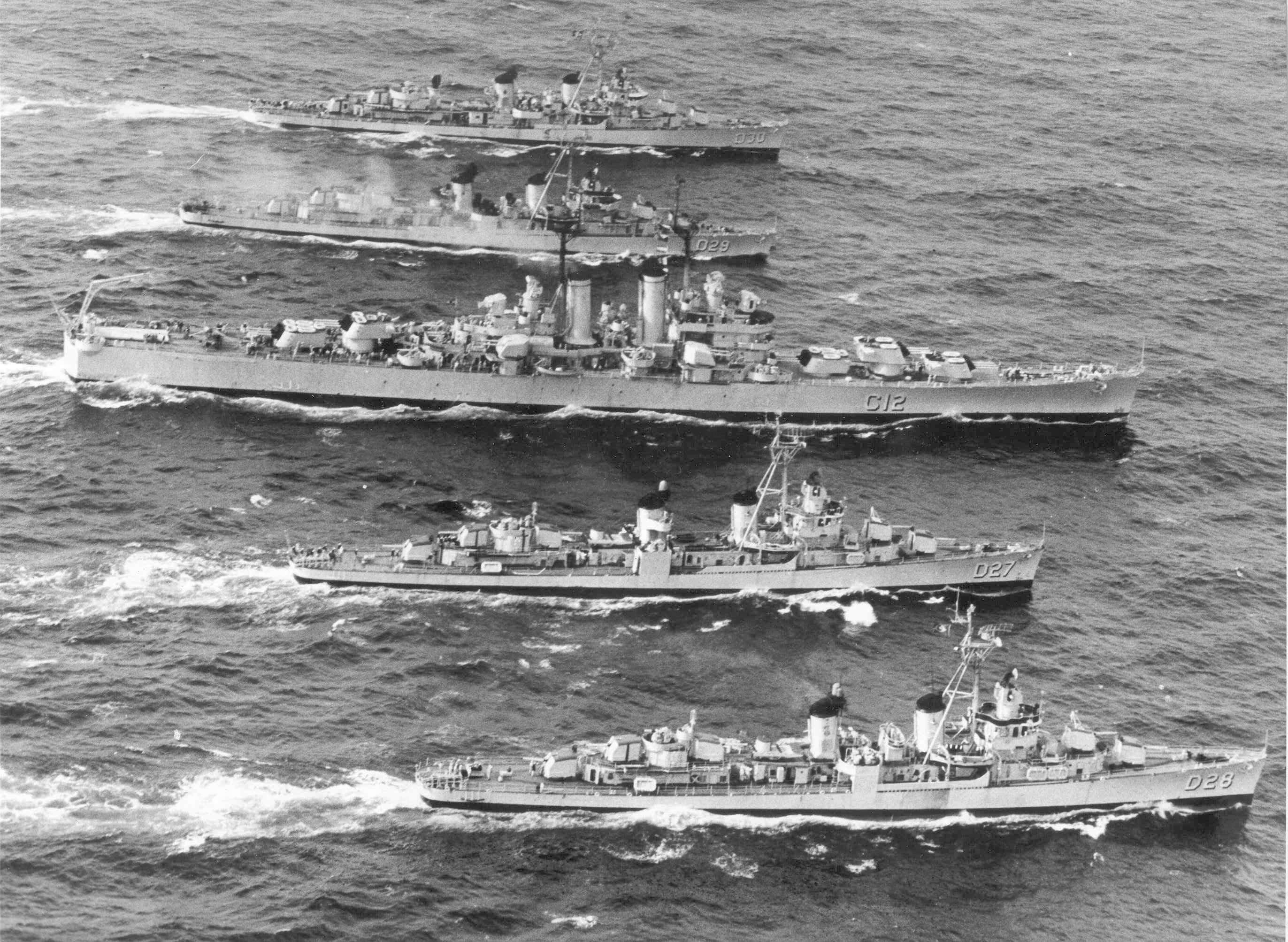
The cruiser Tamandaré (C-12) with four Fletcher-class destroyers, all veterans of the World War II US Navy, in Brazilian service in 1961

In the first decades of the Cold War, Brazil's admirals prepared for a repeat of the past war: an anti-submarine campaign in an auxiliary role to the US Navy. Surplus American destroyers were now the backbone of the fleet. (Note: Seven Fletcher-class, five Allen M. Sumner and two Gearing-class ships received between 1959 and 1973.) Two Brooklyn-class light cruisers replaced the battleships. (Note: The cruisers Barroso (C-11) and Tamandaré (C-12) served until the 1970s.) Second-hand ships were harmful for domestic military shipbuilding, but they gave a proper amphibious capability to the Marine Corps (Note: The Corps was until then a mere guard infantry with some artillery. Four Japanese troopships and several landing craft enabled the first amphibious landing exercises in 1958.) and restored the Naval Aviation service through the light aircraft carrier Minas Gerais (A-11) (ex-Royal Navy HMS Vengeance (R-71)), both in the 1950s. The Air Force insisted on its rights over embarked aviation and ultimately managed to put its own fixed-wing aircraft in the carrier's air wing. Only the helicopters would belong to the Navy. (Note: From 1965 to 1998, the Navy was forbidden by presidential decree from flying fixed-wing aircraft.) This was an anti-submarine air wing without any attack aircraft. Argentina had no such limitations on its own carrier and regained its naval advantage over Brazil.

In the polarized "Populist Republic" (1945–1964), the naval officer corps leaned towards the anti-Vargas or "udenist" side", (Note: In one consequence of this political dispute, in 1955 the Army occupied the capital, president Carlos Luz escaped aboard the cruiser Tamandaré and returned upon hearing of his impeachment by Congress.) whereas enlisted personnel organized in the 1960s in favor of class demands and João Goulart's reforms. This split in the ranks culminated in the 1964 Sailors' Revolt, an immediate factor behind the military coup in the same year. Admirals governed as part of the 1961, 1964 and 1969 military juntas. The 1964 coup installed a military dictatorship which would last until 1985. The new regime purged military personnel aligned with the previous government, and the Navy was most affected. Civic-social actions to riverine populations were now understood as an insurgency prevention method. Amphibious doctrine envisioned landings against insurgent-held territories or rebel troops. The Marine Corps and naval intelligence service were engaged in political repression.

The 1963 "Lobster War", a mobilization against the French Navy without a direct confrontation, laid bare the fleet's low state of readiness. (Note: The French Navy was escorting unauthorized lobster fishing in the Brazilian continental shelf. When the Brazilian Navy had to react, mobilization was difficult and spare parts and ammunition were in short supply. The dispute was resolved diplomatically.) To renew the stock of vessels, the 1967 naval program, implemented during the Brazilian Miracle, ordered modern ships in European shipyards. The highlight of this program was the six British-designed Niterói-class frigates, through which the Brazilian Navy entered the missile age. Two of them were assembled in Brazil, where industrialization was now a consensus in the officer corps. In 1980, the fleet had in service the Minas Gerais, twelve destroyers, six frigates, eight submarines, two tank landing ships and twelve thousand marines. 87% of ships had been built in other states and 57% dated to the 1940s and 1950s. The 1977 program sought to continue this process, introducing, amongst other items, the local construction of submarines and a nuclear program, but the late 20th century economic crisis and transition dragged the projects into the 21st century.

=== Post-Cold War ===
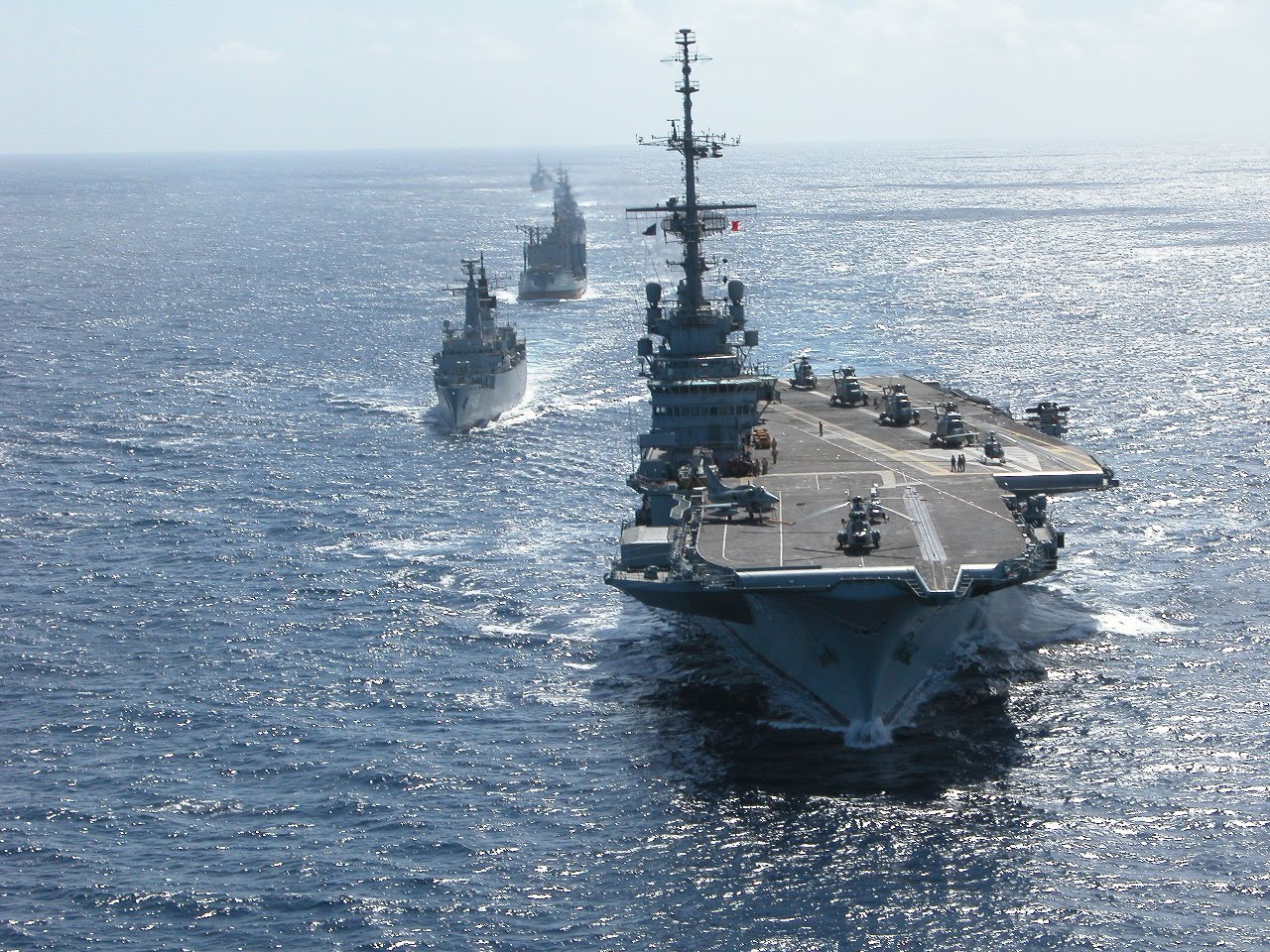
The São Paulo (A-12), successor to the Minas Gerais, leading the fleet in 2004

The end of the Cold War completed another shift in naval thought: the priority given to anti-submarine warfare was dropped, along with its geopolitical premises. (Note: I.e. subordination to a collective hemispheric defense system under American leadership.) The prevailing idea was a balanced fleet with diverse capabilities. The Argentine Navy declined in the 1990s, shifting the balance of power. but the Brazilian Navy was now having to rely once again on second-hand ships, with its naval industry in crisis. Among them was the aircraft carrier São Paulo (A-12), formerly the French Navy's Foch, purchased in 2000 to replace the Minas Gerais. Brazil retained the prestigious title of "carrier power", but couldn't extract much value out of the ship due to its severe maintenance difficulties and obsolete fixed-wing A-4 Skyhawk aircraft in its air wing.

Brazil's international commitments in United Nations peacekeeping missions included deployments of marines to MINUSTAH in Haiti (2004–2017) and a ship to UNIFIL in Lebanon (2011–2020). The fleet shrank: from 2000 to 2022, decommissionings exceeded commissionings, and there were plans to put another 40% of the fleet out of service until 2028. (Note: Two aircraft carriers, a replenishment oiler, three tank landing ships, three submarines, three minesweepers and eleven escorts were decommissioned. In the same period the fleet received a helicopter carrier, an amphibious ship, an escort and two submarines. A further four escorts and three submarines were on order.) By 2007 the Navy's commander already spoke of a "critical state of material and technological obsolescence". The National Defense Strategy, published in the following year, contained a political promise to raise the military to match Brazil's desired status as a first-rank power. The Navy responded with an ambitious expansion plan which would double the fleet in size until the 2030s and commission expensive vessels such as two aircraft carriers and six nuclear submarines. Equipment targets would be supplied, as much as possible, by national industry.

This plan found a deteriorating economic outlook and was shelved in its original form, but several projects survived, while second-hand ships covered other gaps in the inventory. For the Navy's greatest ambition since the 1970s, the nuclear submarine, technical assistance from France was sought for the large-scale and ongoing Submarine Development Program (ProSub). The São Paulo was replaced by the helicopter carrier Atlântico (A-140), formerly the Royal Navy's HMS Ocean (L-12), in 2018.

=== Ongoing programs ===
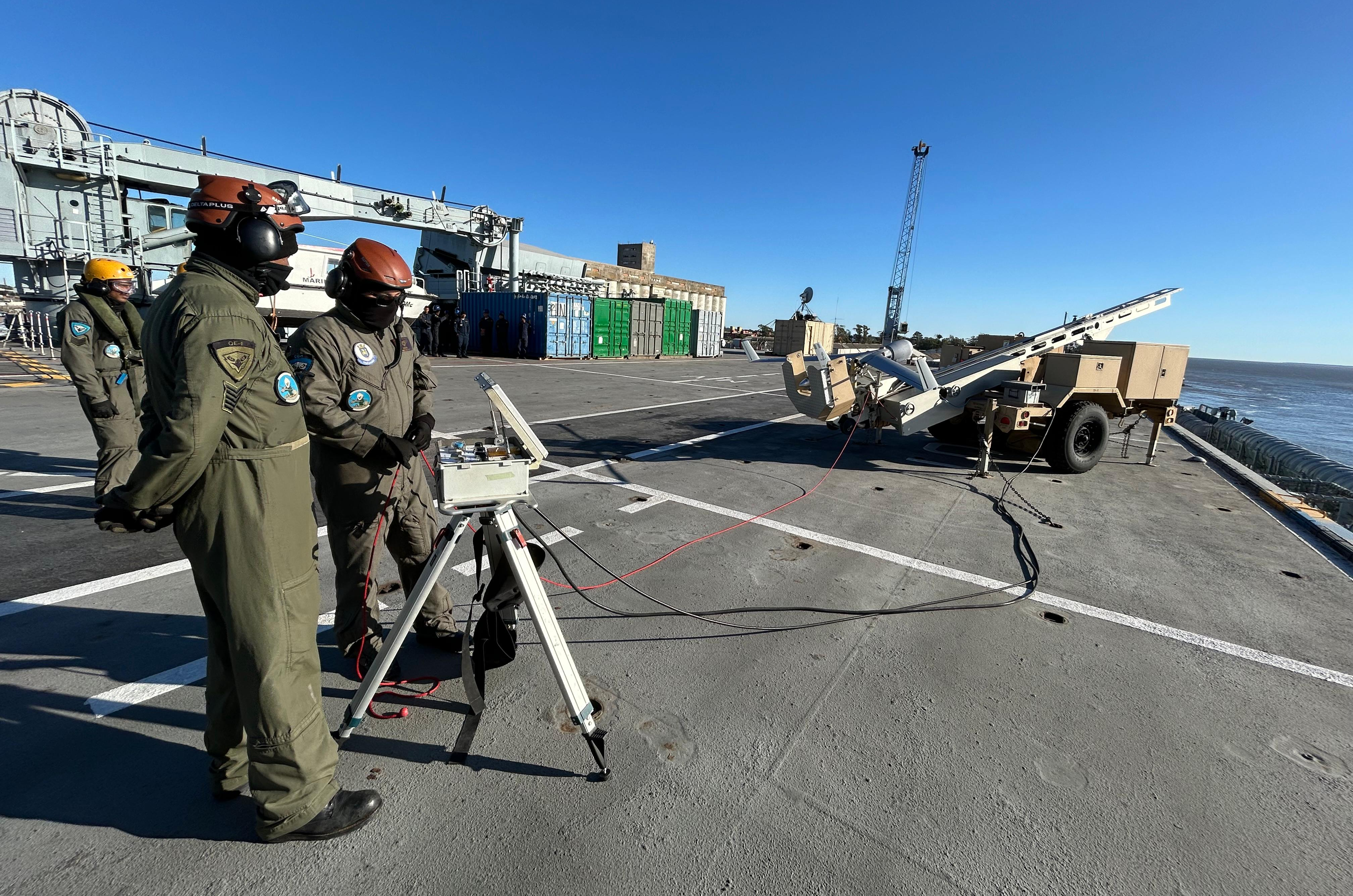
Boeing ScanEagle unmanned aerial vehicle launched from the Atlântico

The Navy's main ongoing efforts are organized under seven strategic programs, among them the Navy Nuclear Program (PNM), Modernization of Naval Power and Blue Amazon Management System (SisGAAz). The Modernization of Naval Power program includes the procurement and construction programs for submarines (ProSub), Tamandaré-class frigates (PFCT), hydrographic and oceanographic ships (Prohidro) and Marine Corps equipment (Proadsumus).

ProSub began in 2009 with a seven billion euro contract with France's Naval Group. It comprises a shipyard and naval base in Itaguaí, Rio de Janeiro, four diesel-electric submarines of the Riachuelo class, which is based on the French Scorpène class, and a nuclear submarine, to be called Álvaro Alberto (SN-10). The original plan was for 21 submarines, but no additional order has been placed since then. Under delayed schedules, as of 2024 the final conventional boat was expected to enter service in 2026, and the nuclear submarine in 2036. French technology transfer does not extend to nuclear components, which are under development by the PNM. This is an older program, devised in the 1970s, and has already mastered fuel production. A reactor is under development. The Navy describes ProSub in grandiose terms, with the Álvaro Alberto becoming "our country's maximal strategic deterrence force". Controversial points in the ProSub and PNM are Brazil's true strategic objective, the cost-benefit ratio of their massive investments and ensuing neglect towards other sectors, and Brazil's relationship with international non-proliferation agencies.

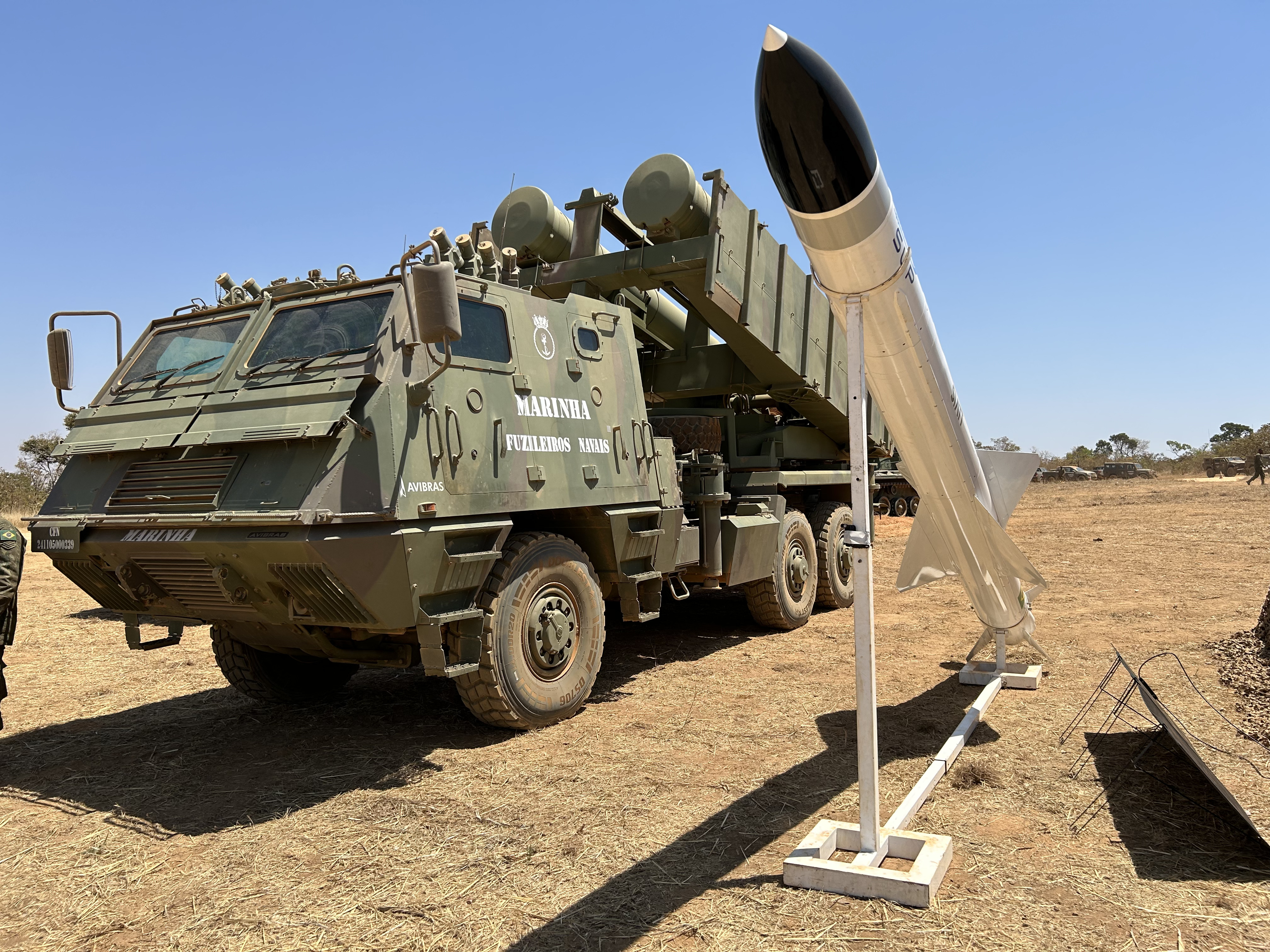
Marine Corps Astros II multiple rocket launcher adapted to fire the MANSUP anti-ship missile

The PFCT comprises the construction of four frigates in Itajaí, Santa Catarina, by a consortium between Embraer, Atech and ThyssenKrupp. The first frigate was launched in 2024, and the conclusion was scheduled for 2029. The Antarctic support ship Almirante Saldanha is under construction at the Jurong Shipyard in Aracruz, Espírito Santo. Progress on SisGAAz has slowed down and the program is likely to be fragmented for investment into priority maritime areas. SisGAAz will connect existing systems with satellites, unmanned aerial vehicles (UAVs), radars and underwater sensors to establish maritime domain awareness over much of the South Atlantic.

SIATT, a domestic company with an Emirati stake, was contracted for industrial-scale production of MANSUP, an anti-ship missile of domestic design, and to develop surface-to-air and air-to-surface versions. MANSUP has been adapted for Marine Corps artillery, and the marines seek a coastal defense capability. Naval Aviation and the Marine Corps have UAV programs, and an unmanned surface vehicle (USV) was tested for the first time in 2023.

=== Planning ===
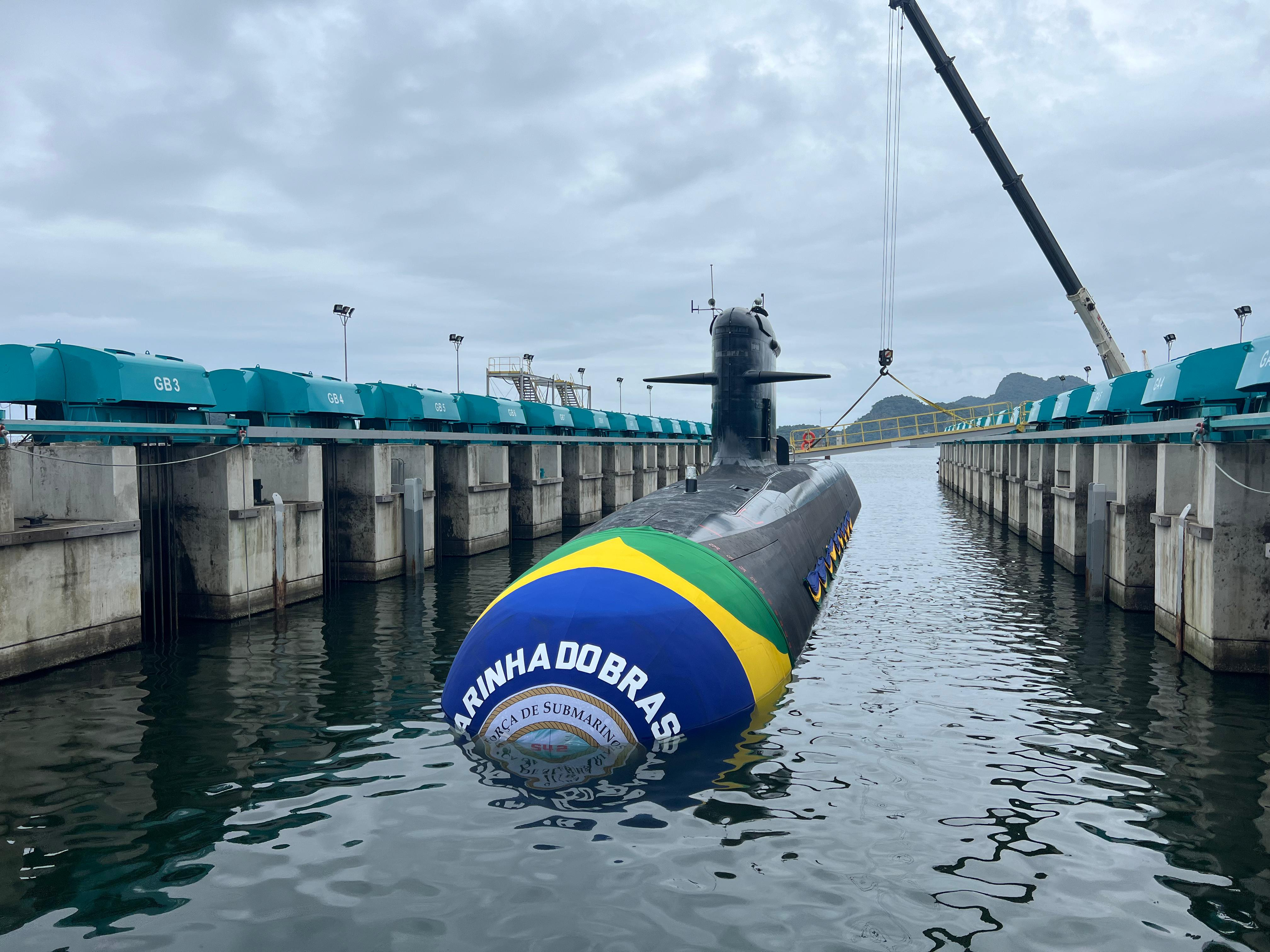
Launching of the submarine Tonelero (S-42) at the Itaguaí Naval Complex

The Strategic Navy Plan 2040, published in 2020, discloses procurement aims for the next twenty years after publishing. Another document, the 2023 Maritime Defense Strategy, established intended capabilities for the next twenty years after 2024. It plans for a fleet with the following components:

- Maritime Intervention Force: eight escorts, a fixed-wing-capable aircraft carrier, 16 reconnaissance, attack and anti-submarine aircraft in the carrier, eight reconnaissance and attack aircraft in the escorts and 40 UAVs.
- Projection Force: the same aircraft carrier, three landing ships, nine landing craft, a battalion of marines, eight transport helicopters and six attack helicopters.
- Maritime Protection Force: ten offshore patrol vehicles, 20 500-ton patrol boats and yet undefined patrol aircraft.
- Attrition Force: four conventional submarines and a nuclear submarine.
- Combat Logistics Force: two replenishment oilers, a submarine tender, four seagoing tugs and a casualty treatment ship.
- Mine Warfare Force: three minesweepers, ten minelayers, a mine warfare-capable submarine rescue ship and undefined unmanned systems.
- Hydroceanographic Services Force: six hydrographic ships, a hydrographic research ship, five buoy tender ships, eight buoy tender avisos, eleven hydrographic motor boats, a riverine hydrographic ship, five riverine hydrographic avisos and eight riverine buoy tender motor boats.
- C5VIR Force: the SisGAAz and command and control elements.
- Antarctic Research Support Force: two antarctic research support ships, three aircraft and an antarctic station.

== Organization ==
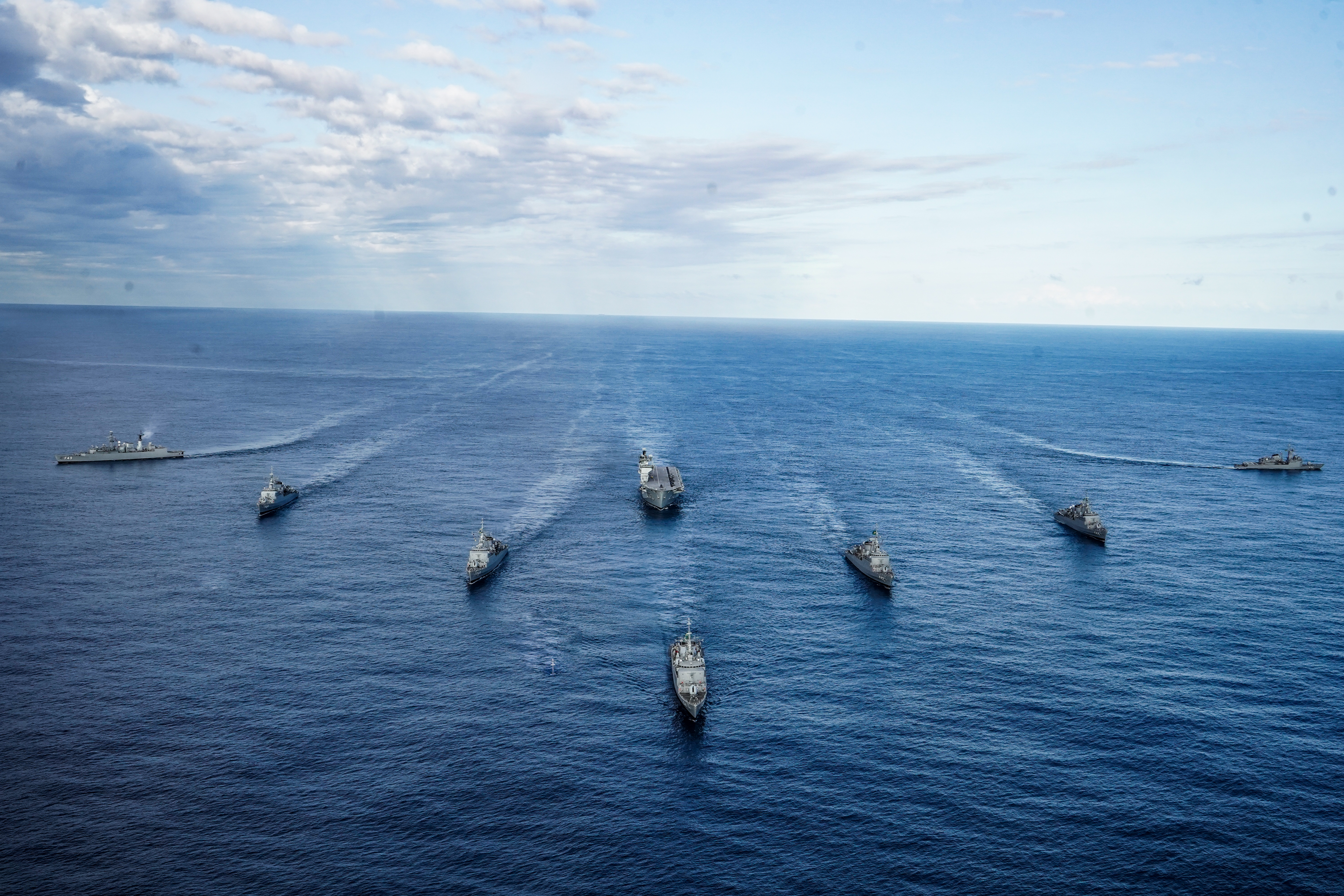
The Fleet in formation in 2023: Atlântico escorted by five Niterói-class frigates, an Inhaúma-class corvette and a Greenhalgh-class frigate

The Navy is under the authority of the President of the Republic, mediated by the Ministry of Defense. The Navy Command is headed by an admiral and headquartered in the Ministries Esplanade in Brasília. He commands a general management body, the Navy General Staff (EMA), direct and immediate assistance bodies, (Note: Navy Strategic Communication Center (CCEM), Navy Internal Control Center (CCIMar), Navy Intelligence Center (CIM), Navy Intelligence School (EsIMar), Office of the Commander of the Navy (GCM), Navy Special Prosecutor's Office (PEM), Secretariat of the Interministerial Commission on Marine Resources (SECIRM) and Naval Secretariat of Nuclear Safety and Quality (SecNSNQ).) collegiate boards, (Note: Council of Admirals (CAL), Commission on Studies on Navy Uniforms (CEUM), Navy Financial and Administrative Council (COFAMAR), Navy Science and Technology Council (CONCITEM), Personnel Planning Council (COPLAPE), Master Plan Council (COPLAN), Navy Information Technology Council (COTIM) and Officer Promotion Commission (CPO).) linked entities, (Note: Amazônia Azul Tecnologias de Defesa (Amazul) and Empresa Gerencial de Projetos Navais (EMGEPRON).) an autonomous linked body (Note: The Admiralty Court.) and sectoral management bodies. (Note: Naval Operations Command (ComOpNav), Marine Corps General Command (CGCFN), Directorate-General of Navy Materiel (DGMM), Directorate-General of Navy Personnel (DGPM), Directorate-General of Navigation (DGN), Directorate-General of Navy Nuclear and Technological Development (DGDNTM) and Secretariat-General of the Navy (SGM).) The EMA conducts strategic studies and devises Brazilian naval thought. To reach consensus, the Navy Commander may call of the collegiate boards, the Admiralty, which is a council of the highest-ranking admirals.

This structure comprise over 300 organizations in 2011, some operational, others for administration and support: training and research institutions, hospitals, bases, depots, pharmaceutical laboratory, ammunitions center, naval attachés and the Navy Arsenal. The bulk of the operational Navy, with its main combat units, is in one of the sectoral management bodies, the Naval Operations Command (Comando de Operações Navais, ComOpNav). As of 2017, ComOpNav controlled 89 out of 102 vessels in service. Most of the remainder were in the Grouping of Hydroceanographic Ships. (Note: The Grouping is part of the structure of the Directorate-General of Navigation. Three avisos served the Naval School, within the Directorate-General of Navy Personnel, and one ship was operated by the Admiral Paulo Moreira Institute of Sea Studies, within the Directorate-General of Navy Nuclear and Technological Development.) Completa-se assim a divisão dos navios em três categorias: meios de Esquadra, meios distritais e meios de pesquisa.

ComOpNav comprises the Commander-in-Chief of the Fleet (Comando em chefe da Esquadra, ComemCh), who commands the "blue-water" fleet and naval aviation; the Fleet Marine Force Command, which is the seagoing component of the Marine Corps; the Naval Districts (DNs), which are the Navy's "coast guard" operational component; the Naval Special Operations Command; the Maritime Operations and Blue Amazon Protection Command (COMPAAz), which oversees maritime traffic monitoring; and the Naval Warfare Doctrine Development Center.

=== Fleet ===
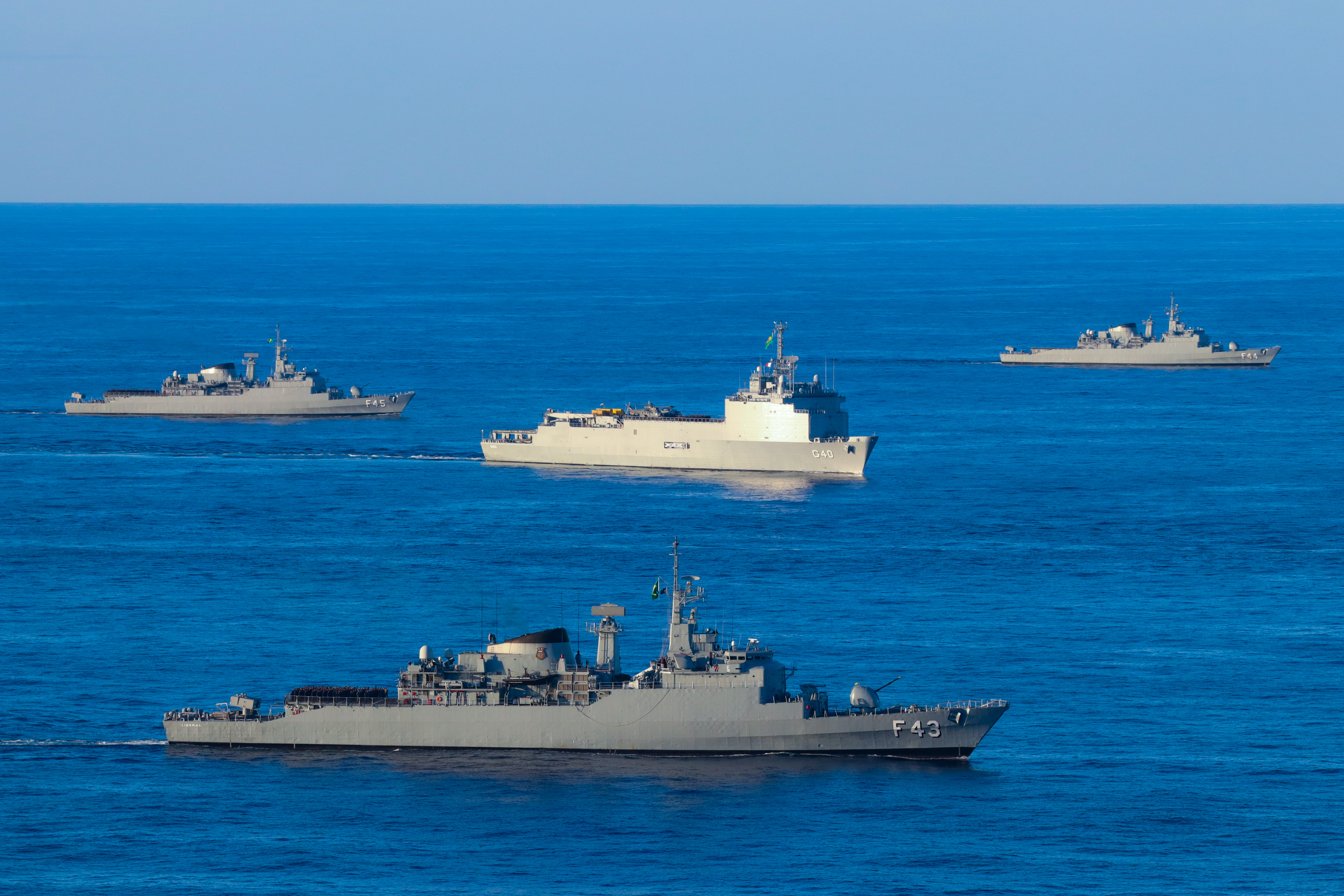
LPD Bahia (G-40) with three Niterói-class frigates

The Fleet (Esquadra) is the core of Brazilian naval power. It is divided between Commands for the Surface Force (ComForSup), Submarine Force (ComForSub) and Aeronaval Force (ComForAerNav). Its home port is in Mocanguê Island, Niterói, Rio de Janeiro. The Submarine Force is based at the Madeira Island Submarine Base, in Itaguaí, and the air arm in São Pedro da Aldeia, both also in Rio de Janeiro state.

The Brazilian Navy is held to be a more modern and technological force than the Army and Air Force, but occasionally and relatively inferior to other South American navies. By the early 2020s, most of its fleet dates back to 1970s and 1980s programs and approaches the end of its service life. In aggregate displacement, it was the world's 22nd largest navy in 2025, with 135,737 tonnes. In this position it was ahead of the Argentine Navy (122,128 tonnes) and behind the Peruvian Navy (170,344 tonnes) and Chilean Navy (176,065 tonnes).

As of 2025, the Fleet had two landing ships with significant aerial capability, the helicopter carrier Atlântico, formerly HMS Ocean, and the landing platform dock (LPD) Bahia (G-40), formerly the French Navy's Foudre. Another LPD is set to be commissioned, the Oiapoque (G-350), formerly HMS Bulwark. The landing fleet also includes a tank landing ship, the Almirante Saboia (G-25), and 16 landing craft.

There are eight escorts: five Niterói-class frigates, a Greenhalgh-class frigate (formerly Royal Navy Type 22), an Inhaúma class corvette and a Barroso-class corvette. (Note: The International Institute for Strategic Studies classes the Barroso-class as a frigate and counts a total of eight principal surface combatants (frigates). The Inhaúma-class corvette is counted among the patrol and coastal combatants.) All escorts have surface-to-surface missiles (MM40 Exocet Block 2) and hangars. The frigates also have surface-to-air missiles (Sea Wolf and Aspide). Other armaments in the escorts include Mk 46 light torpedoes, Boroc anti-submarine rockets and 115 millimeter guns.

The Submarine Force has a Tupi-class (German Type 209), a Tikuna-class (modified Tupi-class) and three Riachuelo-class submarines and a submarine rescue ship. Submarines are armed with SM39 Exocet missiles (only in the Riachuelo class) and Mk 48 and Mk 24 Tigerfish torpedoes. For logistical support, the fleet has the replenishment oiler Almirante Gastão Motta (G-23). The training ship Brasil (U-27) and sail-training yacht Cisne Branco (U-20) are administratively part of the Fleet.

=== Naval Districts ===
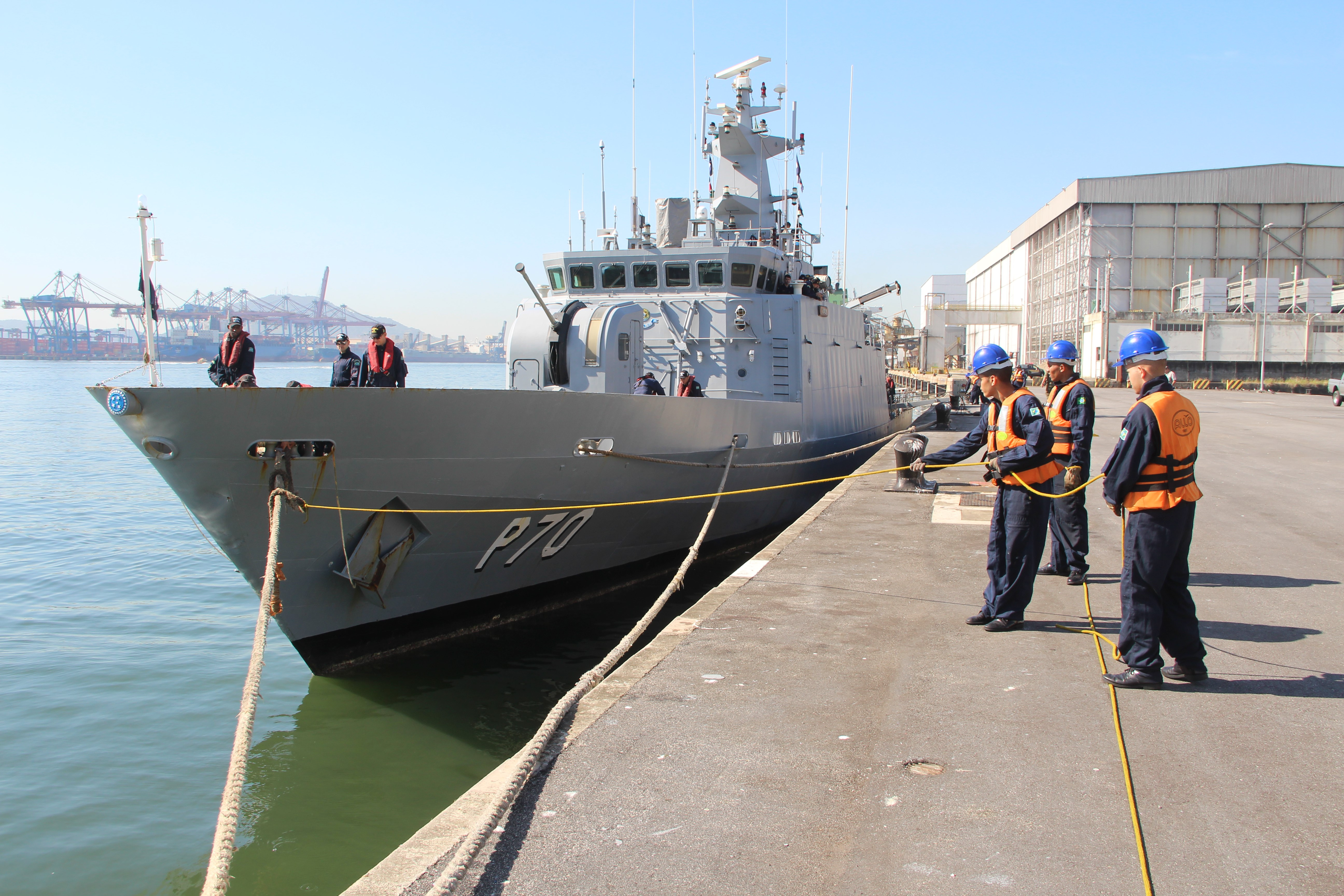
Offshore patrol vessel Macaé (P-70) in the Port of Santos

The Naval Districts divide national territory in nine areas. From the first to the ninth, they are respectively headquartered in Rio de Janeiro, Salvador, Natal, Belém, Rio Grande, Corumbá, Brasília, São Paulo and Manaus. For search and rescue operations under COMPAAz coordination, national territory and the South Atlantic under Brazilian responsibility are divided in Salvamar areas. Salvamar Southeast matches the 1st DN, Salvamar East, the 2nd DN, and so on: Northeast (3rd DN), North (4th DN), South (5th DN), West (6th DN), Midwest (7th DN), South-Southeast (8th DN) and Northwest (9th DN).

Naval Districts operate the two most relevant naval bases outside of Rio de Janeiro, in Aratu, Bahia (2nd DN), and Val-de-Cães, Pará (4th DN), the latter in the Amazon Delta region. Smaller bases exist in Natal, Rio Grande do Norte (3rd DN), Rio Grande, Rio Grande do Sul (5th DN), Ladário, Mato Grosso do Sul (6th DN) and Rio Negro, Amazonas (9th DN). The latter two are riverine bases. The DNs command patrol vessels, buoy tenders, hydrographic survey vessels and regional units of marines and aviation. The 2nd DN commands the mine warfare force. Ladário and Rio Negro are headquarters for the Mato Grosso and Amazonas riverine flotillas. Numerically, most of the Navy is in the Naval Districts, which held 63 out of a total of 102 vessels in 2017. As of 2025 there were 44 patrol vessels of various sizes and three minesweepers in service. (Note: The International Institute for Strategic Studies counted 45 " patrol and coastal combatants", including the Inhaúma-class corvette, which is administratively part of the Fleet.) The smallest distributions of patrol vessels as of 2020 were in the 8th and 5th DNs, which cover the coast of São Paulo and the South.

=== Naval Aviation ===
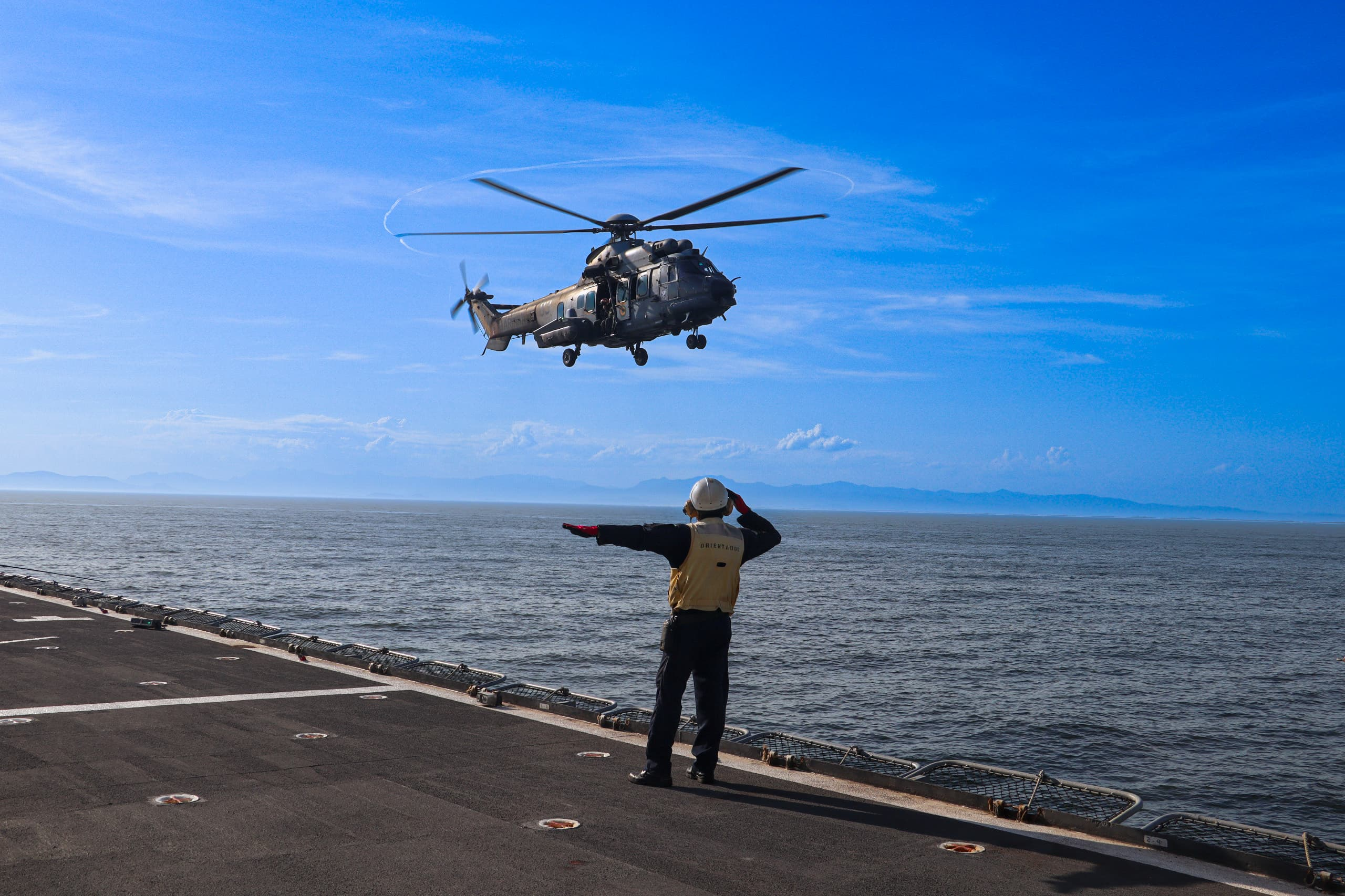
Super Cougar helicopter on the flight deck of Atlântico

The air service is composed of fixed-wing aircraft, helicopters and UAVs. As with the ships, it is split between the Fleet and the Naval Districts. The Fleet's Aeronaval Force Command is based at São Pedro da Aldeia Naval Air Station. The 4th, 5t, 6th and 9th Naval Districts each have their own utility helicopter squadron. The aircraft inventory had a total of 76 units in 2022.

São Pedro da Aldeia bases squadrons of interceptor and attack aircraft (Skyhawk), utility helicopters (two squadrons with Écureuil, H-135 and Super Cougar aircraft), reconnaissance and attack helicopters (Super Lynx), anti-submarine helicopters (Seahawk), training helicopters (Jet Ranger and AS350B3 Écureuil) and UAVs (ScanEagle). Their armament includes AM39 Exocet and AGM-119 Penguin anti-ship missiles. The Super Cougar fleet has variants configured for heavy transport, multi-role (transport, reconnaissance and combat) and combat search and rescue missions.

The fixed-wing squadron has six aircraft still in service. Brazil's Skyhawks have modernized sensors, but lack the armament for modern air-to-air or anti-ship combat. There is uncertainty between the Navy and Air Force over which service should operate maritime patrol aviation, which is currently under the latter. Negotiations for the transfer of the Air Force's P-3 Orion aircraft were dropped by the Navy in 2018.

=== Marine Corps ===
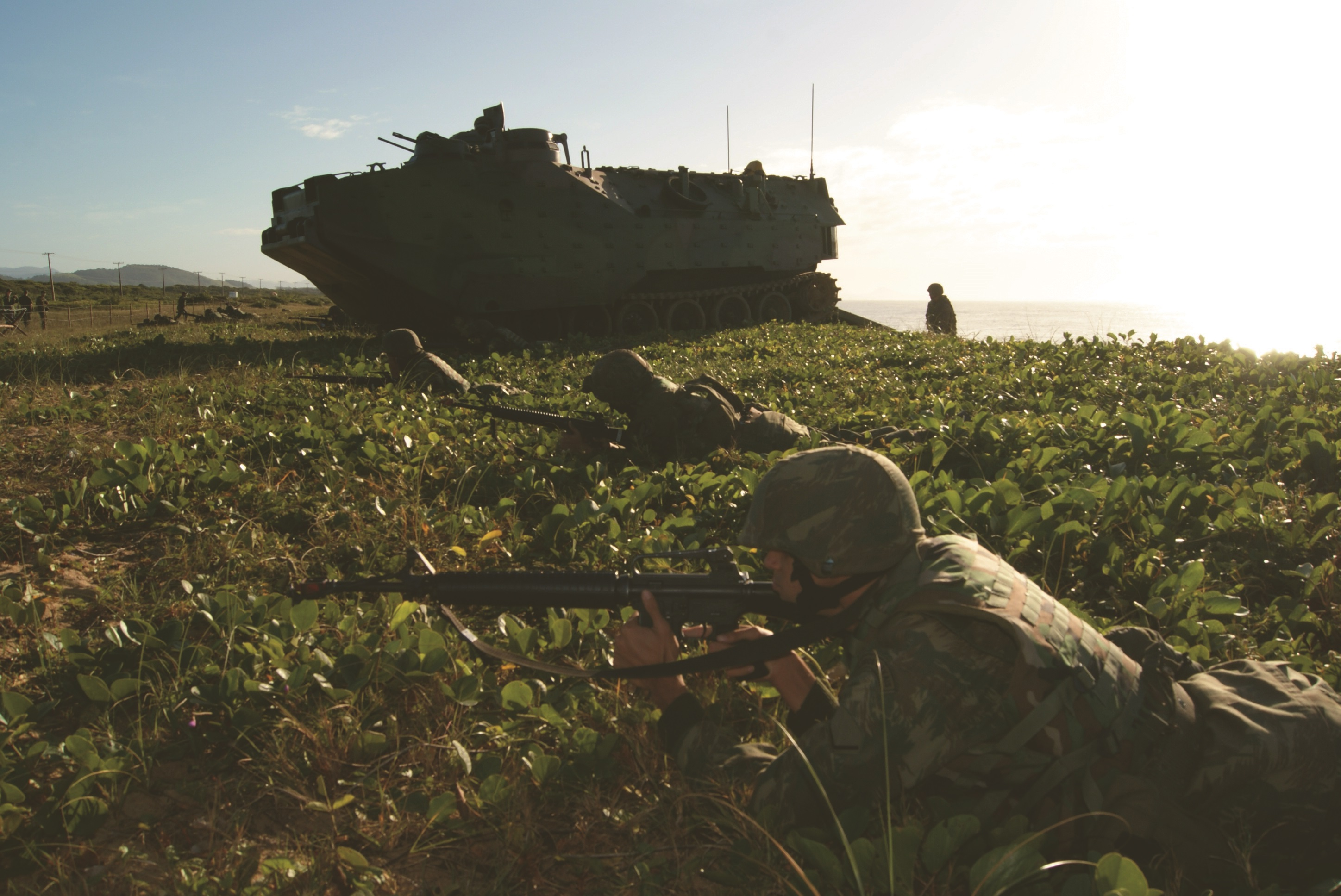
Assault Amphibious Vehicles and marine infantry in an amphibious landing exercise

The naval infantry service is the Corpo de Fuzileiros Navais (CFN), lit. 'Corps of Naval Fusiliers'. It is split between the Fleet Marine Force (FFE) under the ComOpNav, several units under the Naval Districts and a management, doctrinal and technical-administrative body, the Marine Corps General Command (CGCFN). The FFE is based at Flores Island and Governador Island in Rio de Janeiro. It is a light brigade-sized force with three infantry battalions and command and control, artillery, armor, amphibious armor, special operations, logistics, engineering, anti-air, CBRN defense, medical support and military police components. Naval Districts have coastal and riverine operations battalions. Total strength stood at 16,000 marines in 2025.

Power projection over land, if needed through an amphibious assault to conquer a hostile shore, is the CFN's raison d'être. The Fleet does have landing ships for such operations — the Atlântico, for instance, can carry 830 marines — but its limitations in air defense and escorts would be visible in wartime. Aside from amphibious warfare, its procurement of equipment for urban operations suggests an interest in operations against irregular forces in major urban centers. The National Defense Strategy emphasized the CFN's expeditionary character. The FFE is comparable to the Army's airborne and air assault brigades: as quick reaction forces, they must have a higher state of readiness, tactical and strategic mobility and modern equipment.

The CFN's equipment inventory as of 2025 included 60 armored personnel carriers (M-113, Piranha III and JLTV), 46 Assault Amphibious Vehicles, SK-105 Kürassier light tanks, L118 105-milimeter howitzers, Astros II multiple rocket launchers and K6A3 120-milimeter mortars.

=== Special operations ===
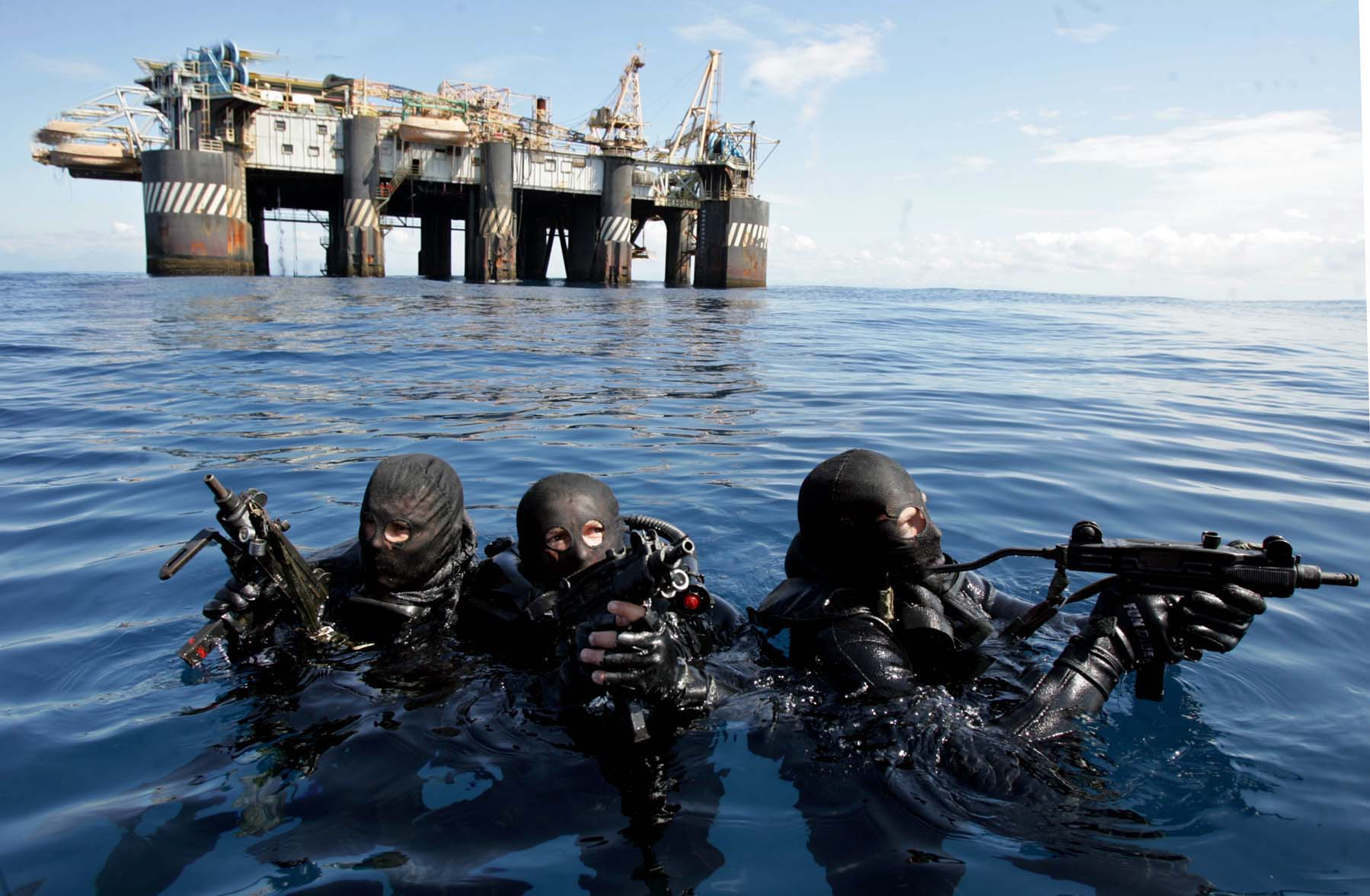
Combat divers in an oil platform during an exercise

Two elite units in the Navy conduct special operations, the Marine Special Operations Battalion ("amphibious commandos"), which is part of the Fleet Marine Force, and the Combat Divers Group (GRUMEC), part of the Submarine Force. Their main distinction is their operational environment: amphibious commandos on land and combat divers at sea, including boarding operations on ships and oil platforms.

=== Directorate-General of Navigation ===
Two specialized directorates are under the Directorate-General of Navigation (DGN), the Directorate of Ports and Coasts (DPC) and the Directorate of Hydrography and Navigation (DHN). The DPC handles the merchant marine, national maritime policy and waterway safety and policing. The DHN handles hydrography, oceanography, cartography, meteorology, navigation and navigational aids. Its Grouping of Hydroceanographic Ships, with nine vessels as of 2025, commands hydrographic, oceanographic, buoy tender and polar ships.

=== Historical heritage ===
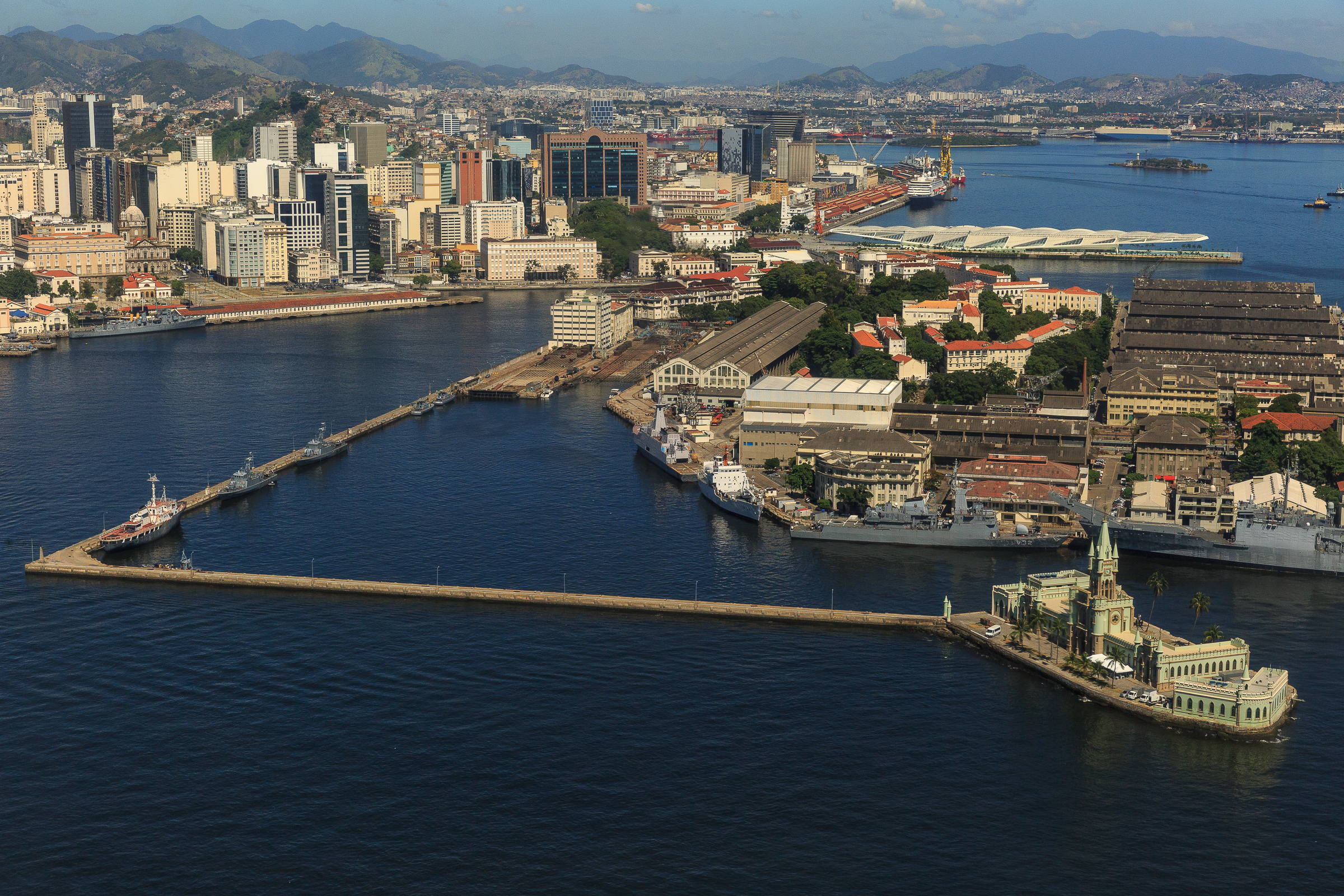
Fiscal Island, the Navy Arsenal and the Navy Cultural Space in central Rio de Janeiro

The Secretariat-General of the Navy commands the Directorate of Navy Historical Heritage and Documentation (DPHDM), tasked with the preservation and promotion of historical and cultural heritage. It aims to conserve institutional memory and develop Brazil's maritime consciousness. The DPHDM runs the Naval Museum, Navy Archive, History Department, SDM Publishing House, Navy Library, Navy Cultural Space and Fiscal Island, all of them in Rio de Janeiro. The Navy Archive has thirty million written documents on paper, dated to the 18th century, as well as audiovisual and sound archives in its custody. Smaller archives concerning the Navy are held at the National Archives and Historic and Geographic Institute. The DPHDM publishes the Brazilian Maritime Magazine and the Navigator periodical.

The Navy Cultural Space showcases museum ships, the Riachuelo (S-22), the destroyer escort Bauru (D-18), and tugboat Laurindo Pitta, and other equipment: an EE-9 Cascavel armored car and Skyhawk and Sea King aircraft. There are other museums across the country, such as the Nautical Museum of Bahia, the Ary Parreiras Museum in Natal, and specialized museums such as the Naval School Museum, the Flores Island Museum, Naval Aviation Museum and Marine Corps Museum.

== Industrial base ==
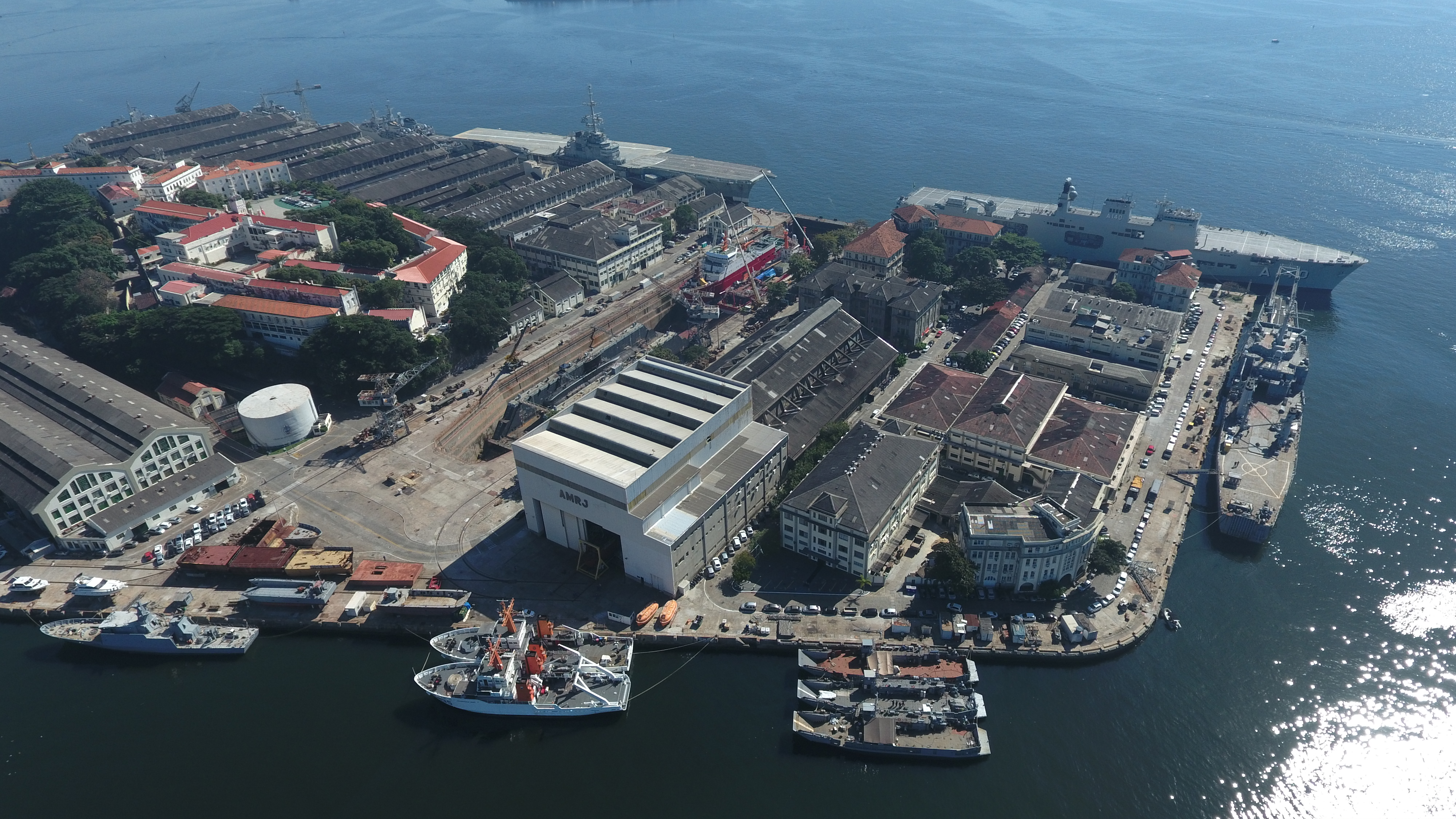
Rio de Janeiro Navy Arsenal at Cobras Island, Rio de Janeiro. Anchored in the back, the São Paulo (left) and Atlântico (right)

Shipyards in the United States and Western Europe are the Brazilian Navy's main foreign suppliers. But Brazil also has a long history of bi-national shipbuilding agreements and efforts to develop its own naval industry, even if reliant on foreign designs and components. It is the only state in Latin America to assemble its own submarines and has progressed in autonomy in small surface combatants.

As a rule, naval ships were built by the Navy's own shipyard, the Rio de Janeiro Navy Arsenal (AMRJ) at Cobras Island, with exceptions at private shipyards such as Verolme, Ishikawajima and Indústria Naval do Ceará. At present, frigates are built at ThyssenKrupp's Brasil Sul Shipyard in Itajaí, and submarines at the Itaguaí Naval Complex. The AMRJ is the Navy's largest industrial complex, with three dry docks, among them the Almirante Régis Dock, the largest in Latin America and large enough for aircraft carriers. Larger maintenance cycles are conducted at AMRJ, and other major repairs in Val-de-Cães, Belém. Other bases do minor repairs. Naval stations in Rio Grande and Rio Negro (Manaus) have the smallest capabilities. Val-de-Cães has a 225-meter long dry dock, Aratu, 220 meters, and Ladário, 80 meters.

The naval military complex extends to support, training, education and research organizations, such as the Naval Systems Analysis Center (Casnav), the Navy Technological Center in São Paulo (CTMSP), which develops the nuclear program, the Naval Projects Management Company (EMGEPRON) and the Navy Ammunition Factory (FMM). In the private sector, as of 2016 there were 353 Brazilian companies with any participation in the Navy's military equipment demand. Their main activities were in the construction, repair and maintenance of vessels. 76% of these companies were in the Southeast. Brazil also had one of the world's largest civilian shipbuilding industries, peaking at 5.6% of global displacement produced in 1980. In the 21st century, growth in this sector has been driven by the oil industry. There were 26 shipyards in 2010, over half of them in the state of Rio de Janeiro.

== Personnel ==
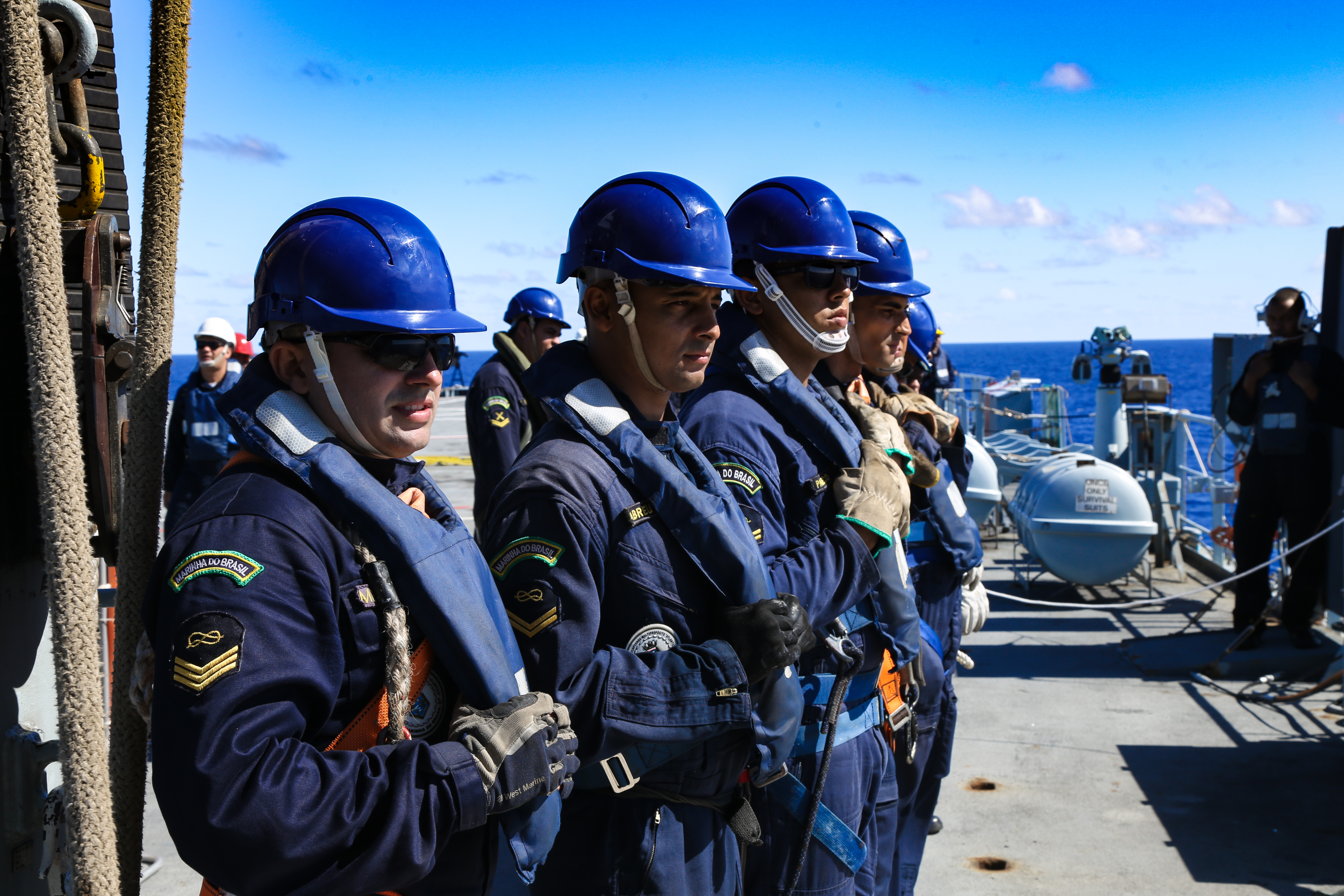
Sergeants and corporals aboard the Atlântico

The Navy Command oversaw 77,216 federal employees in 2026. Officer strength was fixed at 12,980 in 2026, including 86 admirals and 3,831 temporary officers. Enlisted strength stood at 61,100 for 2025, including 7,094 temporary personnel.

Naval life is distinguished by long periods of confinement and distance from relatives ashore. Direct contact with the population, and interest from sociological studies, is lower than in the Army. On the other hand, contact with other states is greater and the Navy is the most cosmopolitan service branch. A distinction must be made with marines, who are more active on land and have a separate identity within the service.

For those who serve at sea, workloads are large and each crewman has more than one task. A ship is a machine laden with volatile materials and failure-prone components. Its unnatural environment exacts physiological adaptations on crews. Service aboard can mean an exposition to weights, fuel gases, solvents and noise and cause diseases such as hearing loss, disc herniation and musculoskeletal disorders. Some sailors give in to alcoholism. Ship motions induce motion sickness and disembarkment syndrome. Conditions are worse in some ships. The crew of a small minesweeper, for instance, must face strong motions and water rationing. The most extreme environment is found in a submarine, with its cramped spaces and total absence of natural light. Nevertheless, some studies with Brazilian submariners suggest crews can handle the stress, which the authors have credited to esprit de corps and the personnel selection, training and management processes. Military psychology remains an understudied field in Brazil.

=== Hierarchy ===
As an institution cemented on hierarchy and discipline, naval personnel are scaled according to circles, ranks and seniority. Generically, those in the circle of general officers are called "admirals", senior officers are called "commanders" and intermediary and junior officers are called "lieutenants". (Note: The post of capitão-tenente comprises the circle of intermediary officers.) Marines use the same ranks as the rest of the Navy, with the exception of the lowest rank, "soldado" (private, lit. 'soldier'), instead of "marinheiro" (seaman, lit. 'sailor'). Each circle is a division of social life in work stations, mess halls, restrooms and accommodations.

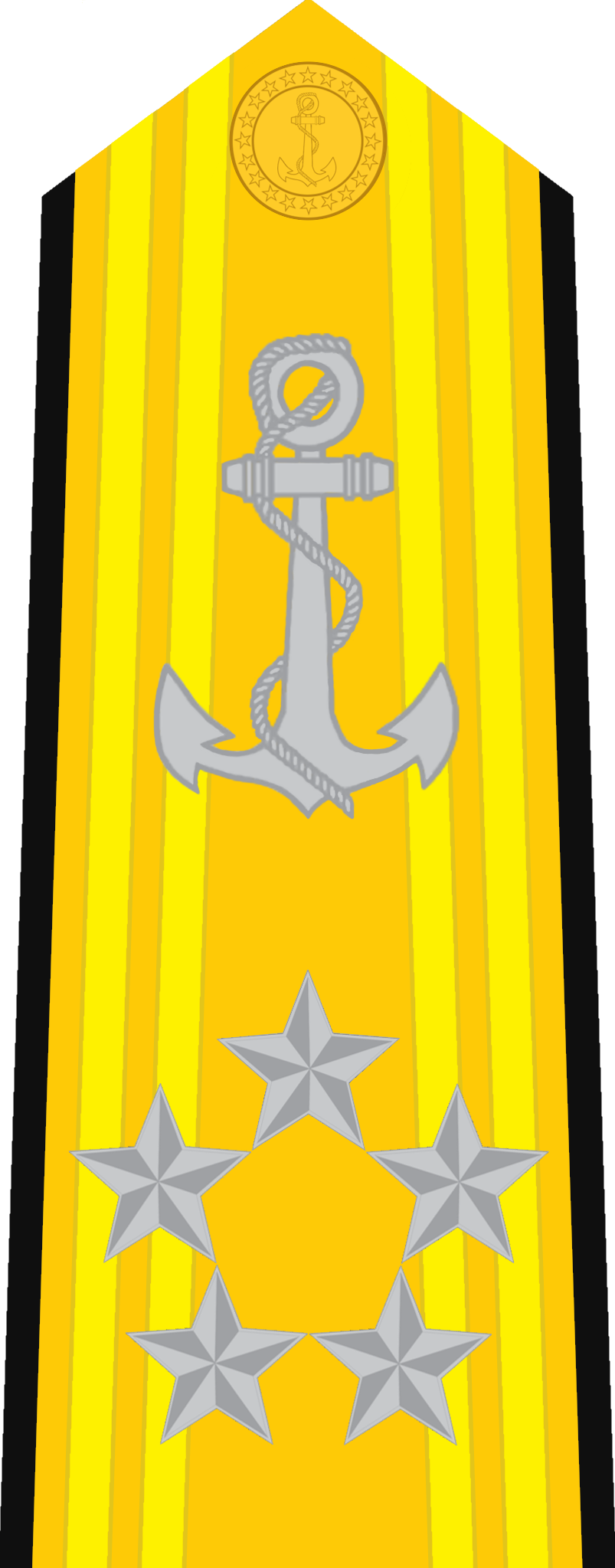
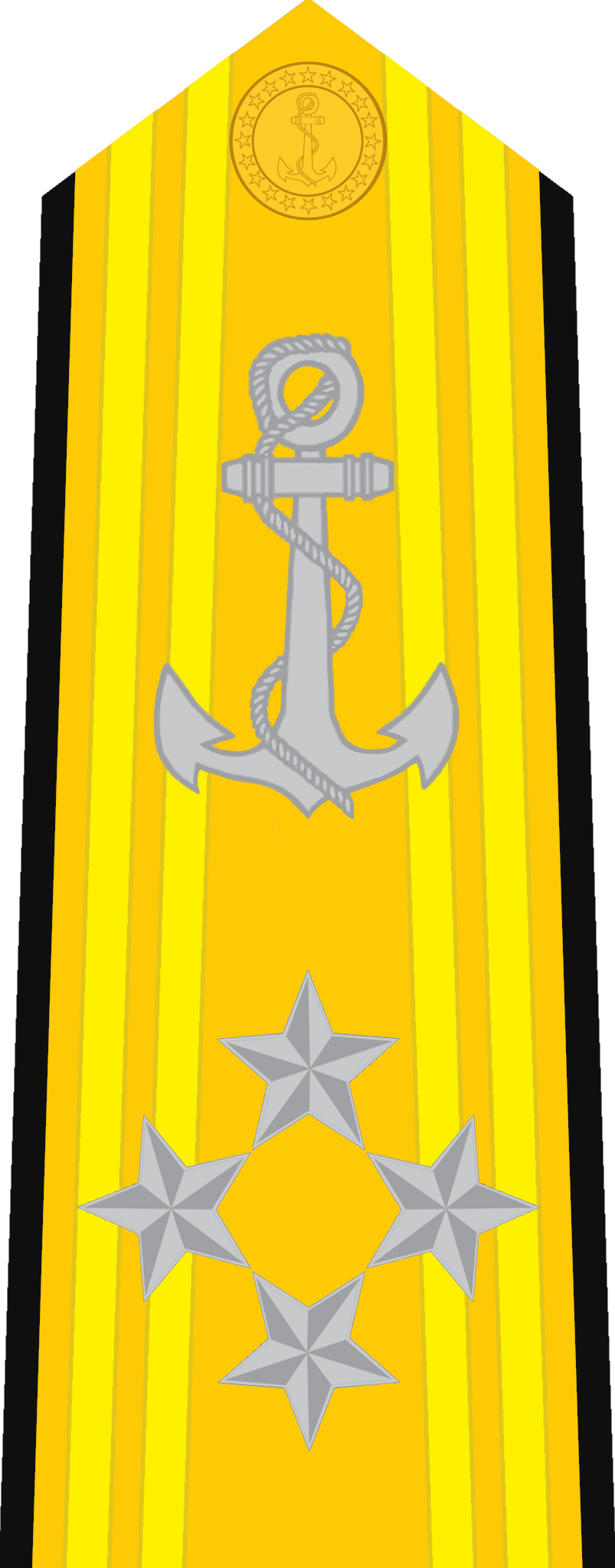
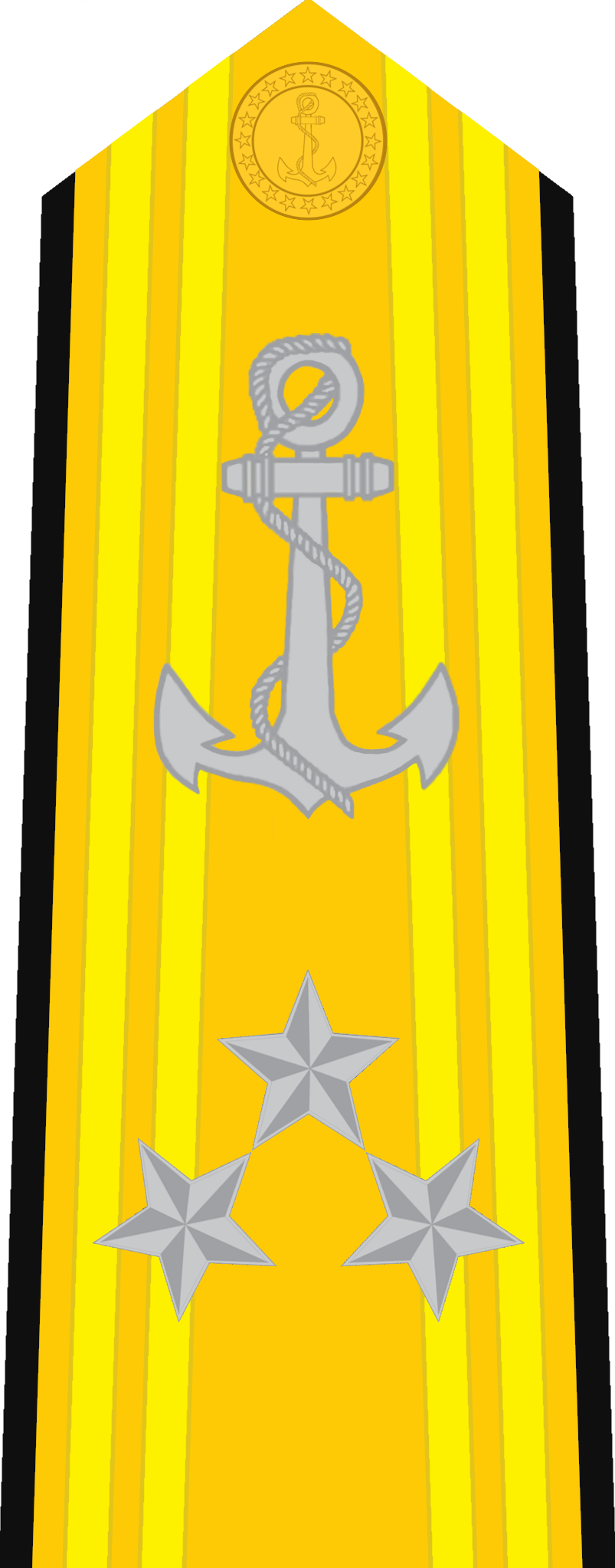
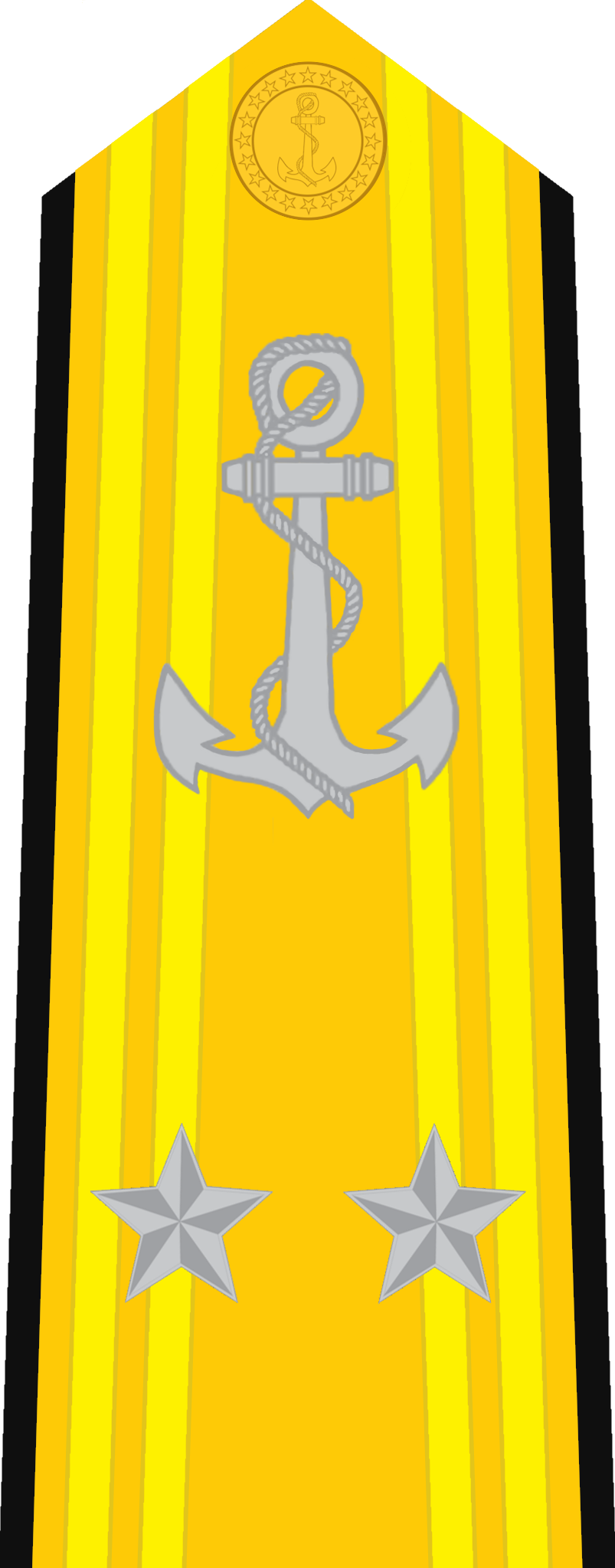
Rank group	General / flag officers				Senior officers			Junior officers
Brazilian Navy
Brazilian Navy	Almirante (Note: Only used in wartime or in honor of figures such as Barroso and Tamandaré.)	Almirante de esquadra	Vice-almirante	Contra-almirante	Capitão de mar e guerra	Capitão de fragata	Capitão de corveta	Capitão-tenente	Primeiro-tenente	Segundo-tenente

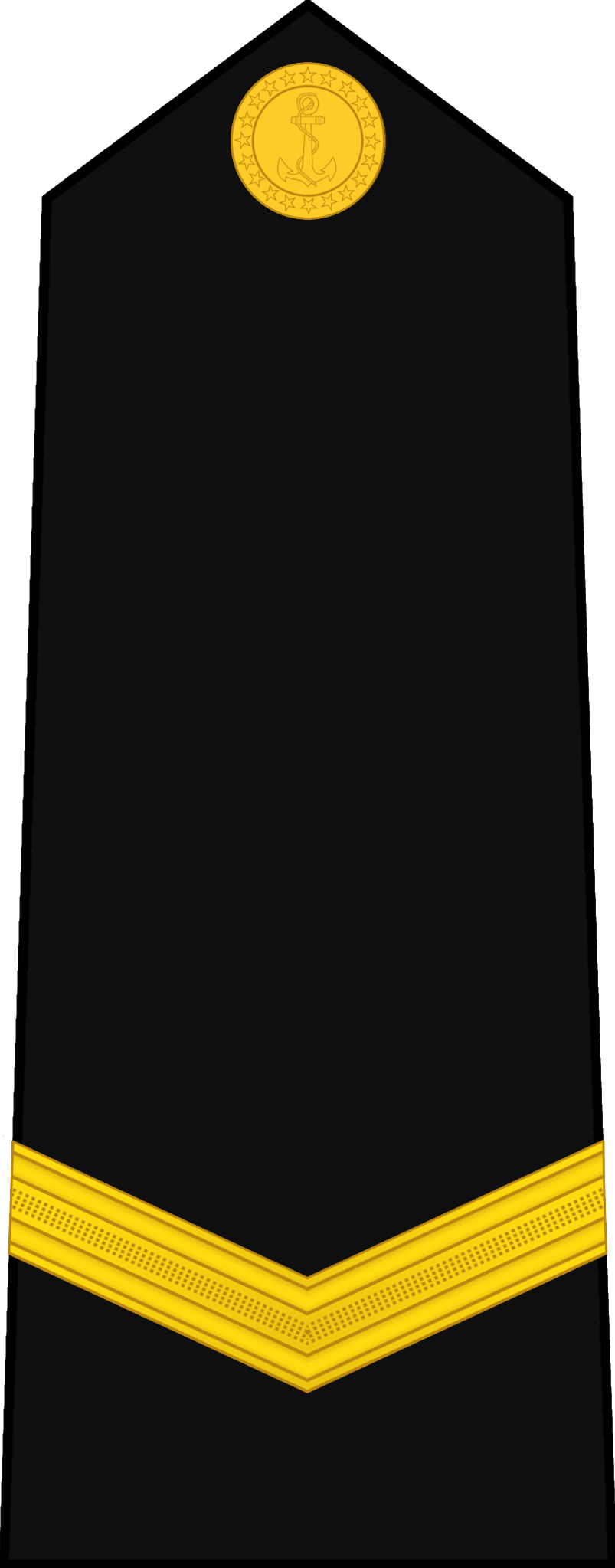
Rank group	Senior NCOs				Junior NCOs	Enlisted
Brazilian Navy
Brazilian Navy	Suboficial	Primeiro-sargento	Segundo-sargento	Terceiro-sargento	Cabo	Marinheiro

=== Corps and Cadres ===
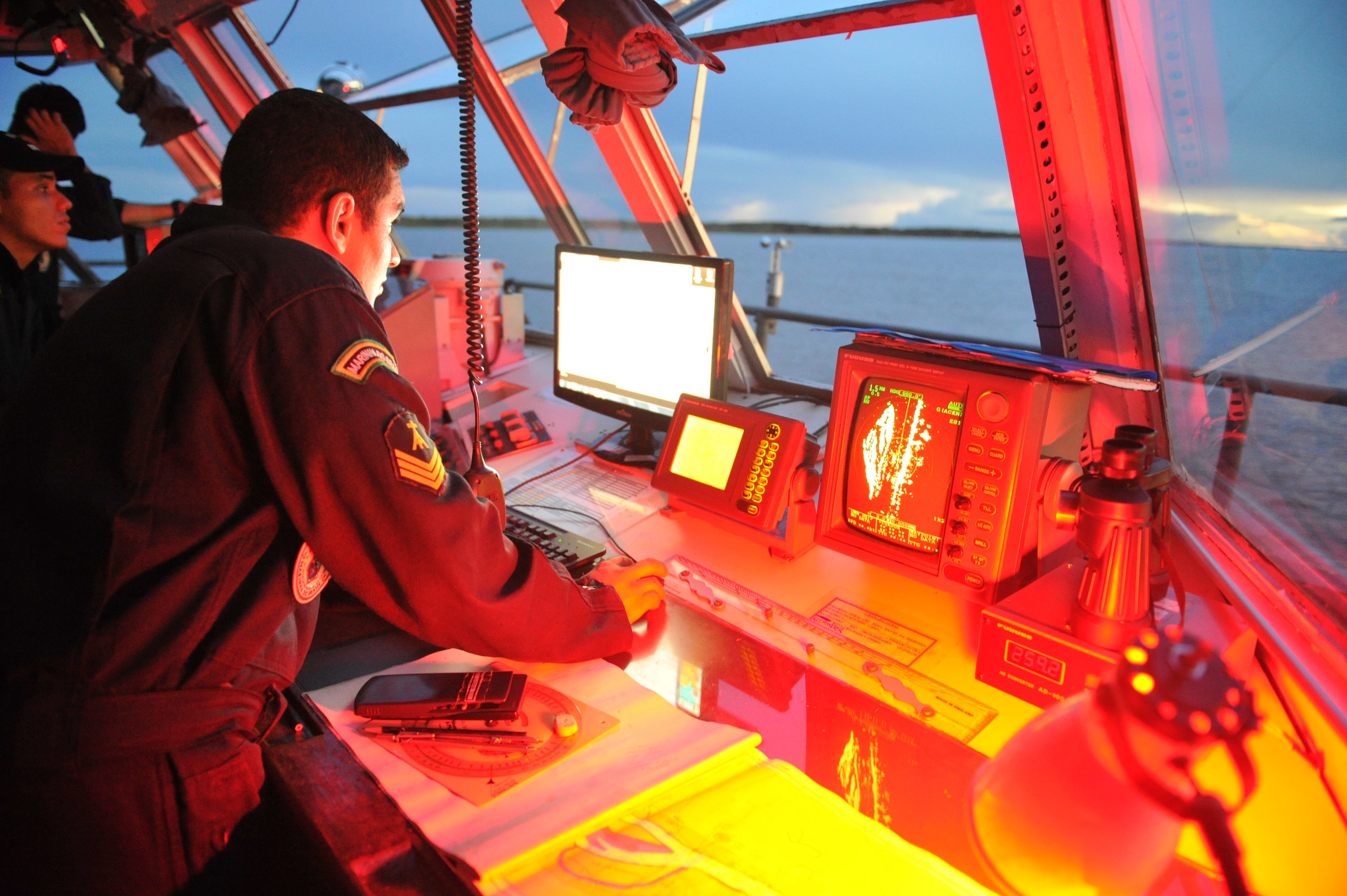
Hydrographer third sergeant abord the hospital ship Doutor Montenegro (U-16)

To manage a high functional complexity, the Navy's personnel are divided in Corps and those in Cadres. Three of the Corps — Fleet (Armada), Marines and Quartermasters — draw a main officer cadre from the Naval School (Escola Naval, EN) and a complementary officer cadre from a competitive examination for entrees with their own higher education. The Fleet Corps draws the most attention, as it is responsible for the force's basic activity, navigation. The Marine Corps is charged with ground combat, and the Quartermaster Corps, with logistics, economics, finance, property, administration and internal control.

Main commands are held by EN officers. Prestige and career prospects scale according to the Corps and Cadre's closeness to war. EN Fleet and Marine officers reach the maximum peacetime rank (almirante de esquadra). Quartermasters, Medical and Engineering officers are at a second degree, potentially rising to vice-almirante, as they are responsible for the proper functioning of human and material resources. The Auxiliary Corps, which is responsible for technical-administrative services, only reaches the post of capitão de mar e guerra; enlisted men promoted to officers are placed in this Corps. Complementary cadres for the Fleet, Marines and Quartermasters can only reach the rank of capitão-tenente. Enlisted personnel have a simpler division: only the Enlisted Fleet Corps, Enlisted Marine Corps, Enlisted Auxiliary Corps and Enlisted Navy Reserve Corps. The Enlisted Fleet Corps mans ships and shore establishments.

=== Education ===
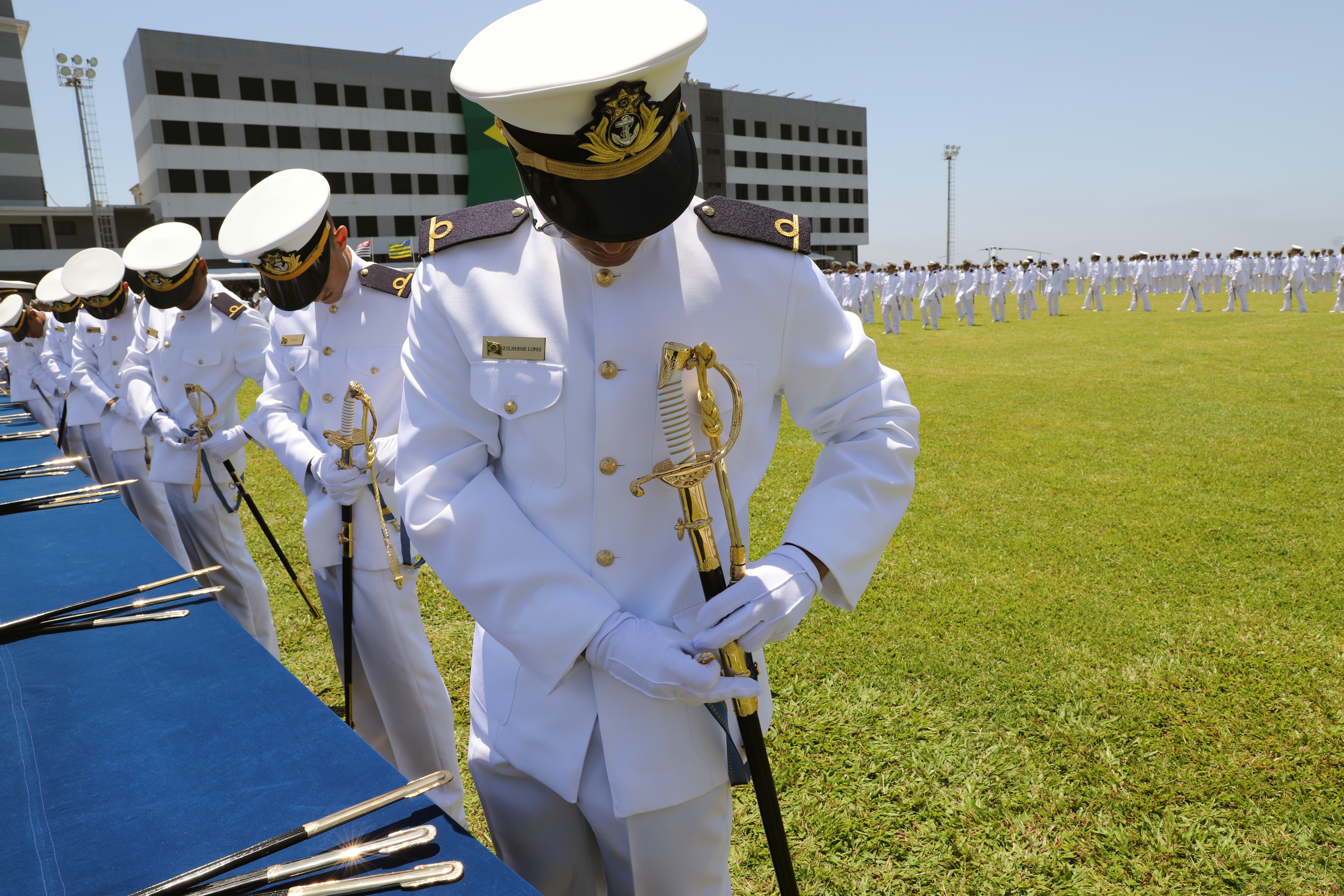
Graduation of midshipmen at the Naval School

Career officers are drawn from two institutions: the Naval School, for the Fleet, Marines and Quartermaster Corps, and the Admiral Wandenkolk Instruction Center (CIAW) for complementary cadres of those three Corps and the Engineering, Medical and Auxiliary Corps. Enlisted personnel enter the Fleet Corps through the Apprentice-Seamen Schools (Escolas de Aprendizes-Marinheiros), and in the Marine Corps, through the Admiral Milcíades Portela Alves Instruction Center (CIAMPA) and Brasília Instruction and Training Center (CIAB). Conscription provides a very small percentage of total strength in the Navy as a whole, and none in the Marine Corps, which is composed exclusively of professional soldiers, an important distinction from the Army. The Navy also runs the merchant marine officer academy, with centers in Rio de Janeiro and Belém.

As of 2012, over half of the annual officer cohort was drawn from CIAW. Those are professionals with civilian academic backgrounds: physicians, pharmacists, engineers, social workers, lawyers, statisticians and others. The Naval School, on the other hand, is a military academy, which offers a bachelor's degree. Most of its midshipmen (aspirantes) come from the Colégio Naval, a high school ran by the Navy. At the end of their second year, aboard the fleet in the "Aspirantex" exercise, midshipmen choose their Corps and Qualification (Electronics, Weapons Systems or Mechanics, for the Fleet and Marines, and Administration, for Quartermasters). Higher ratings are needed to enter the Marine and Quartermaster Corps, as they have less vacancies: in 2002, 60% were reserved for the Fleet, 20% for Marines and 20% for Quartermasters. The option of Corps is definitive for the rest of an officer's career. At the end of the fourth year, midshipmen are declared guardas-marinha and follow a training voyage, the "golden voyage", aboard a training ship.

Officers are promoted by seniority, merit, and for admirals, choice. An officer's education spans his entire career: there are specialized instruction centers for hydrography and oceanography, aviation, submarines and diving, amphibious warfare, nuclear technology and so on, and a postgraduate staff college with courses in command, policy and strategy, the Naval War College (EGN). The EGN enables an officer for posts in the upper naval administration. As of 2007, a combatant officer's career plan comprised eleven years in the junior and intermediary officer ranks and eighteen years in the senior officer ranks, achieving a transfer to the paid reserve with a minimum of thirty years in service.

The Enlisted Fleet Corps receives 18 to 22-year old candidates in entrance exams for the four Apprentice-Seamen Schools in Vila Velha, Olinda, Florianópolis and Fortaleza. Specialization courses for corporals and sergeants are held at the Admiral Alexandrino Instruction Center (CIAA). The trajectory from seaman to suboficial takes an average of thirty years.

=== Social profile ===
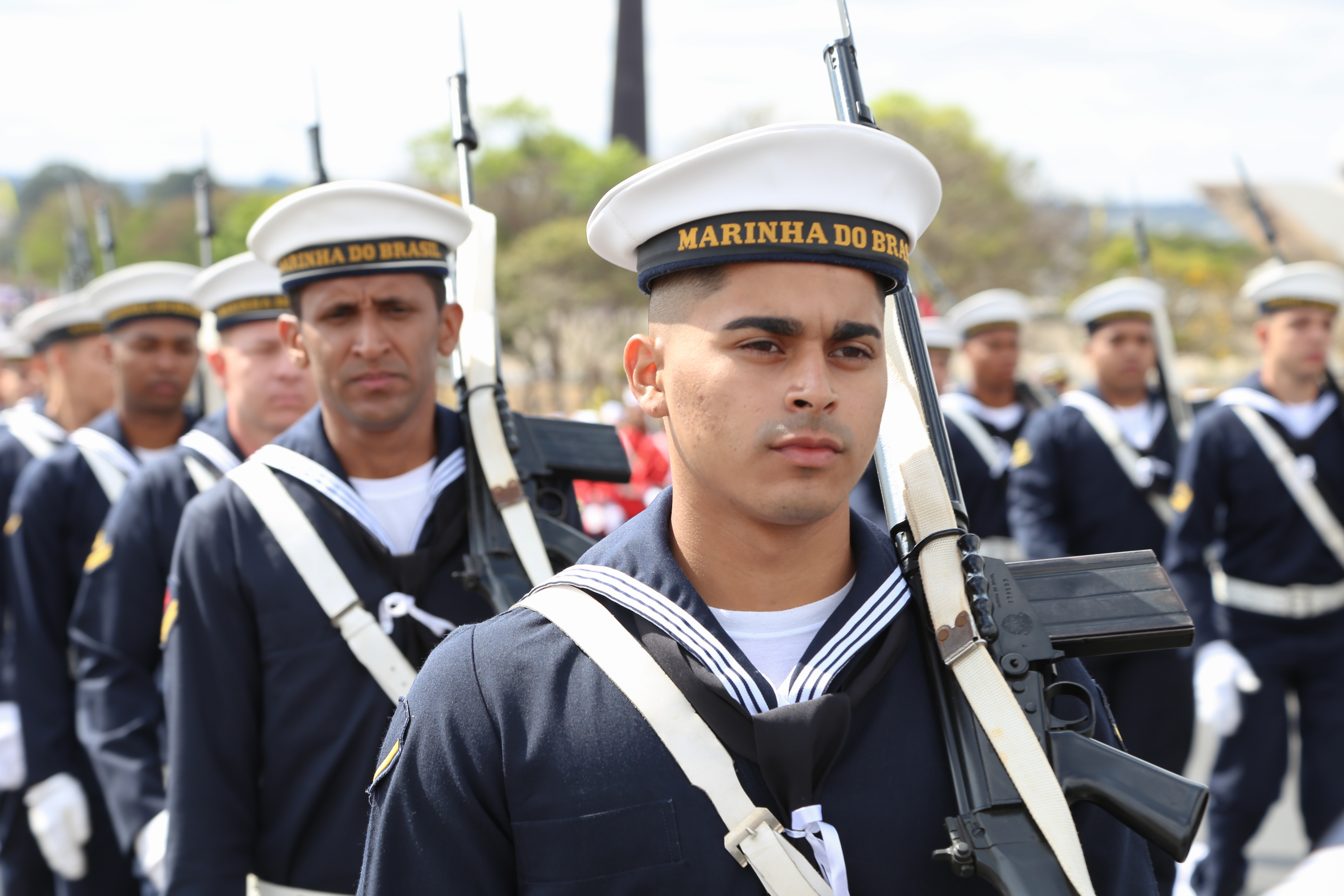
Seamen at the 2019 Independence Day parade

The Navy has been described as "the most aristocratic and conservative of the services". Its officer corps is historically held to represent the white middle and upper classes. The Imperial Navy was described as an "island of whites" and "well-kept display" by historian and Army officer Nelson Werneck Sodré.

This image has become less true since the late 20th century, with a growing number of lower class, lower middle class and nonwhite midshipmen at the Naval School. Among the cohort of 2013, 31% had parents with full higher education and 20–25% had parents in the military, of which 69% were from the enlisted ranks. 82% were from the state of Rio de Janeiro. This confirms other studies which suggest a lower rate of endogenous recruitment (i.e. from military parents) in the Navy and Air Force. Out of a sample of 94 officers at the EGN in 1998, family professions were highly varied, with "middle sectors" most common, with the caveat that this sample was not statistically relevant.

At the other end of the hierarchy, enlisted cadres were formed in the 19th century with foreign mercenaries, then impressment (Note: See blood tax.) of criminals, vagabonds, minors, natives, slaves and merchant crewmen and ultimately through the Companies (and later, Schools) of Apprentice-Seamen, which received poor youths and orphans, younger than the current recruits. Racial composition was mostly black and mulatto. Indiscipline abounded and officers enforced their authority with corporal punishment, a practice lasting until the 1910 Revolt of the Lash. The level of technical knowledge was low.

After 1910 the Apprentice-Seamen Schools became the primary source of enlisted men. Recruitment criteria were tightened, avoiding orphans and excessively uneducated candidates. Over time, professional education adapted to the demands of the industrial age. After World War II, the "artisan-seaman" had become the "technical specialist-seaman". However, in the 1960s a seaman was still seen as an individual of "dubious morality, regularly in brothels and violent, addicted and alcoholic". Social support was insignificant and the right to marry was restricted. The Constitution denied the right to vote. This was the background to another mutiny in 1964. A study of the 1964 revolt concluded conditions (food, leisure, health and citizenship) have since then improved and the early 21st century Navy is a more transparent institution, but Brazilian society is unconcerned with seamen and marine soldiers.

=== Women ===
Service in some roles in the Navy was opened to women in 1980, in the former Navy Reserve Auxiliary Feminine Corps (CAFRM), and broadened in the following decades. As of 2025, women can enter the Quartermaster, Engineering, Medical and part of the Auxiliary Corps and the Musician Cadre of the Enlisted Marine Corps. Female officers, depending on their cadre, may rise to the post of vice-almirante. In 2025 there were 6,922 women in active service, of which 3,197 were officers and 3,725, enlisted personnel.

=== Traditions ===
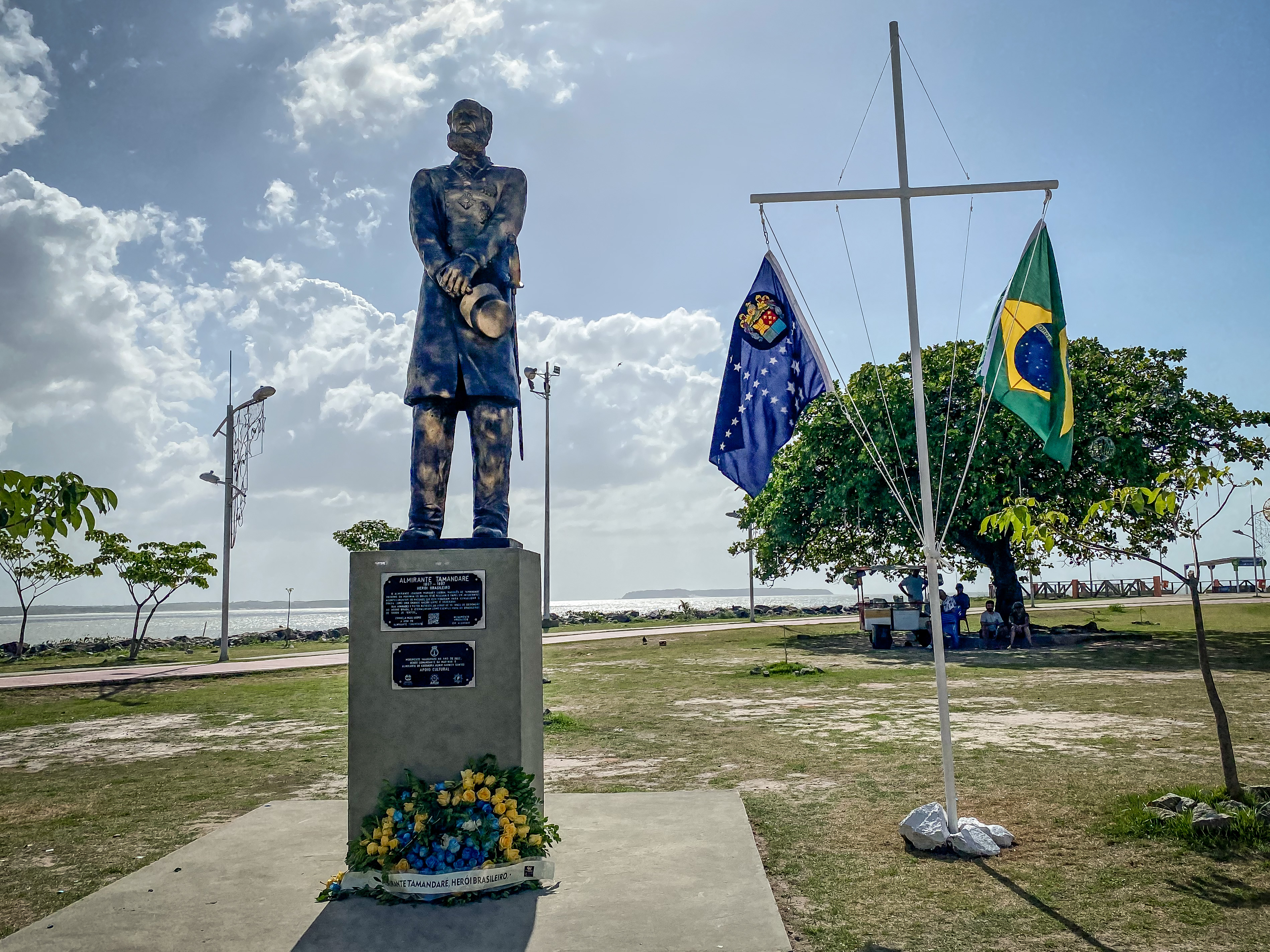
Monument to Admiral Tamandaré in São Luís

As a seafaring institution, the Navy has a distinct language, traditions, ceremonies and customs, many of them shared between navies in the whole world. And as a military institution, it reveres civic values and historic traditions and values its esprit de corps. Ship names commemorate Brazilian locations, historical figures and species, often repeating old names. The motto "Tudo pela pátria" ("Everything for the fatherland") is written on every vessel. The national flag is hoisted from the stern, and the 21-star naval jack from the bow. A 21-star pennant atop the mast shows the ship is commanded by a naval officer. If any higher authority in the chain of command is aboard, the pennant is replaced by the appropriate rank flag. The commander of naval operations in the War of the Triple Alliance, Joaquim Marques Lisboa, the Marquess of Tamandaré, became the Navy's patron. 11 June, the anniversary of the Battle of Riachuelo, is Navy Day, and 13 December, Tamandaré's birthday, is Sailors' Day.

== Notes and references ==
=== Bibliography ===
==== Books ====
- Almeida, Nival Nunes de; Gonçalves, Fernando Antônio (2019). "A formação e capacitação profissional na Marinha do Brasil: um vetor do poder marítimo" (PDF). In Francisco Eduardo Alves de Almeida; William de Sousa Moreira (orgs.) (eds.). Estudos marítimos: visões e abordagens. São Paulo: Humanitas. ISBN 978-85-7732-388-3.
- Barreto Neto, Raul Coelho (2012). Marujos de primeira viagem: os aprendizes-marinheiros da Bahia (1910–1945). Salvador: EDUNEB. ISBN 978-85-7887-061-4.
- Bonalume Neto, Ricardo (2021). A nossa Segunda Guerra: os brasileiros em combate, 1942-1945. São Paulo: Contexto. ISBN 978-65-5541-069-3.
- Brasil: nunca mais (10th ed.). Petrópolis: Vozes. 1985.
- Cabral, Ricardo Pereira (2022). "Pensamento estratégico naval brasileiro". In Francisco Carlos Teixeira da Silva et al. (org.) (ed.). Dicionário de história militar do Brasil (1822-2022): volume II. Rio de Janeiro: Autografia. ISBN 978-85-51849-10-1.
- Cascardo, Francisco Carlos Pereira (2005). O Tenentismo na Marinha: os primeiros anos — (1922 a 1924). São Paulo: Paz e Terra. ISBN 85-219-0766-4.
- Carvalho, José Murilo de (2006). Forças Armadas e política no Brasil (2nd ed.). Rio de Janeiro: Jorge Zahar Ed. ISBN 85-7110-856-0.
- Carvalho, Andréa Bento (2018). Economia do mar: conceito, valor e importância para o Brasil (PDF) (Thesis). Programa de Pós-Graduação em Economia do Desenvolvimento da Pontifícia Universidade Católica do Rio Grande do Sul.
- CEMBRA. O Brasil e o mar no século XXI: Relatório aos tomadores de decisão do país (3rd ed.). Niterói: Centro de Excelência para o Mar Brasileiro. ISBN 978-65-991881-2-1.
- CPDOC FGV (2001). Dicionário histórico-biográfico brasileiro, pós-1930. Rio de Janeiro: Centro de Pesquisa e Documentação de História Contemporânea do Brasil.
- D'Araujo, Maria Celina; Castro, Celso; Cheibub, Zairo (2002). O Brasil e as Forças Armadas na percepção dos oficiais da Marinha. Rio de Janeiro: Centro de Pesquisa e Documentação de História Contemporânea do Brasil.
- DPHDM (2022). Carta de serviços ao usuário (PDF). Rio de Janeiro: Diretoria do Patrimônio Histórico e Documentação da Marinha.
- Gardiner, Robert; Chumbley, Stephen; Budzbon, Przemysław, eds. (1995). Conway's All the world's fighting ships 1947–1995. Annapolis, Maryland: Naval Institute Press. ISBN 1-55750-132-7.
- International Institute for Strategic Studies (2025). The Military Balance 2025. Routledge. ISBN 978-1-003-63076-0.
- Hudson, Rex. A. (1998). Brazil: a country study. Washington, D.C.: Federal Research Division.
- Kassenova, Togzhan (2014). Brazil's nuclear kaleidoscope: an evolving identity (PDF). Carnegie Endowment for International Peace.
- Lima, Maria Regina Soares de; et al. (2017). Atlas da política brasileira de defesa (PDF). Rio de Janeiro: Latitude Sul. ISBN 978-987-722-231-9.
- Livro Branco de Defesa Nacional (PDF). Brasília: Ministério da Defesa. 2012.
- Lopes, Roberto (2014). As garras do cisne: o ambicioso plano da Marinha brasileira de se transformar na nona frota mais poderosa do mundo. Rio de Janeiro: Record. ISBN 978-85-01-04255-2.
- Martins Filho, João Roberto (2010). A marinha brasileira na era dos encouraçados, 1895–1910. Rio de Janeiro: Fundação Getúlio Vargas. ISBN 85-225-0803-8. OCLC 679733899.
- Moura, José Augusto Abreu de (2014). A estratégia naval brasileira no pós-Guerra Fria: uma análise comparativa com foco em submarinos. Rio de Janeiro: Fundação de Estudos do Mar. ISBN 978-85-85966-25-6.
- Negrete, Ana Carolina (2016). "Plataforma naval militar". Mapeamento da base industrial de defesa. Brasília: ABDI/IPEA. ISBN 978-85-6132-341-7.
- Oliveira, Jorge Rubem Folena de (2022). "Garantia da Lei e da Ordem,". In Francisco Carlos Teixeira da Silva et al. (org.) (ed.). Dicionário de história militar do Brasil (1822-2022): volume I. Rio de Janeiro: Autografia. ISBN 9788551849095.
- Paula, Eurípedes Simões de (2004). "A Marinha". In Sérgio Buarque de Holanda (dir.) (ed.). O Brasil monárquico, v. 6: declínio e queda do império. História geral da civilização brasileira. Rio de Janeiro: Bertrand Brasil. ISBN 85-286-0506-X.
- Rodrigues, Fernando Silva; Silva, Carlos André Lopes da (2022). "Fontes históricas navais". In Francisco Carlos Teixeira da Silva et al. (org.) (ed.). Dicionário de história militar do Brasil (1822-2022): volume I. Rio de Janeiro: Autografia. ISBN 978-85-518-4909-5.
- Salles, Felipe; Galante, Alexandre (2023). "The Brazilian Navy entering its third century". In Conrad Waters (ed.). Seaforth World Naval Review 2024. Pen & Sword. ISBN 978-1-3990-2312-2.
- Ventura, Victor Alencar Mayer Feitosa (2020). Environmental Jurisdiction in the Law of the Sea: the Brazilian Blue Amazon. Springer. ISBN 978-3-030-50543-1.
- Vidigal, Armando Amorim Ferreira (2002). A evolução do pensamento estratégico naval brasileiro: meados da década de 70 até os dias atuais. Rio de Janeiro: Clube Naval.
- Waters, Conrad (2016). "The Americas". Navies in the 21st century. Barnsley: Seaforth. ISBN 978-1-4738-4994-5.

==== Articles ====
- Alsina Jr., João Paulo Soares (2010). "Reflexões sobre a forma de recrutamento das Forças Armadas Brasileiras e suas implicações para a defesa nacional". DADOS - Revista de Ciências Sociais. 53 (2). Rio de Janeiro: IESP - UERJ: 469–500.
- Alves, Vágner Camilo (2005). "Ilusão desfeita: a "aliança especial" Brasil-Estados Unidos e o poder naval brasileiro durante e após a Segunda Guerra Mundial". Revista Brasileira de Política Internacional. 48 (1). doi:10.1590/S0034-73292005000100006.
- Assis Filho, Jaime Florencio de (2013). "Segunda Guerra Mundial: principais missões da Marinha de Guerra brasileira no teatro do Atlântico Sul". Revista Marítima Brasileira. 133 (1/3). Rio de Janeiro: Diretoria do Patrimônio Histórico e Documentação da Marinha.
- Cantídio, Luiz Carlos da Silva (1993). "O combatante anfíbio — Parte 1". Revista Marítima Brasileira. 113 (7–9). Rio de Janeiro: Serviço de Documentação Geral da Marinha.
- Carvalho, Vinicius Mariano de (2019). "Blue Amazon: Brazil's maritime vocation" (PDF). Strategic Defense Communications. 7. NATO StratCom COE. ISSN 2500-9478.
- Costa, José Augusto Fontoura (2017). "A Amazônia Azul e o domínio marítimo brasileiro". Revista USP (113). Archived from the original on 2018-07-22.
- Ferreira, Daniel do Nascimento; Montenegro, Letícia Almeida; Nobre, Fábio (2020). "O poder marítimo do Brasil: uma análise da potencialidade do Nordeste brasileiro no fomento da projeção de poder sobre o Atlântico Sul". Revista de Estudos Internacionais. 11 (2). Universidade Estadual da Paraíba. ISSN 2236-4811.
- Garcia, Eugênio Vargas (2003). "A diplomacia dos armamentos em Santiago: o Brasil e a Conferência Pan-Americana de 1923". Revista Brasileira de História. 23 (46). doi:10.1590/S0102-01882003000200008.
- Halpern, Elizabeth Espindola; Leite, Ligia Costa (2014). "Marinha do Brasil: uma trajetória do enfardamento". Antíteses. 7 (13). doi:10.5433/1984-3356.2014v7n13p158.
- Herz, Mônica; Dawood, Layla; Lage, Victor Coutinho (May–August 2017). "A nuclear submarine in the South Atlantic: the framing of threats and deterrence". Contexto Internacional. 39 (2).
- Martins Filho, João Roberto (July–December 2006). "As Forças Armadas brasileiras no pós-Guerra Fria". Tensões Mundiais. 2 (3). Fortaleza: Universidade Estadual do Ceará.
- Martins Filho, João Roberto (2009). "Marinha, tecnologia e política no Brasil do século XX ao século XXI". Revista Marítima Brasileira. 129 (10/12).
- Martins Filho, João Roberto (July–December 2011). "O projeto do submarino nuclear brasileiro". Contexto Internacional. 33 (2). Instituto de Relações Internacionais da PUC-Rio.
- McCann, Frank (2017). "'Brasil: acima de tudo' !! the Brazilian Armed Forces: remodeling for a new era" (PDF). Diálogos. 21 (1).
- Moura, José Augusto Abreu de (2015). "Três ciclos da Marinha do Brasil". Revista da Escola de Guerra Naval. 21 (1).
- Moura, José Augusto Abreu de; Baptista, Ana Fernanda Moreira (2018). "Submarinos e submarinistas". Revista da Escola Superior de Guerra. 33 (69).
- Pesce, Eduardo Ítalo (2013). "Cenários prospectivos: um vislumbre da guerra naval do futuro". Revista da Escola de Guerra Naval. 19 (2).
- Pinheiro, Alvaro de Sousa (2012). "Knowing your partner: the evolution of Brazilian special operations forces" (PDF). JSOU Report (12–7).
- Sá, Andrea de (2015). "Brazil's nuclear submarine program: a historical perspective". The Nonproliferation Review. 22 (1): 3–25. doi:10.1080/10736700.2015.1070044.
- Silva, Alexandre Pereira da (2020a). "The concept of Brazilian Jurisdictional Waters and its impact on the freedom of the high seas". The International Journal of Marine and Coastal Law (35). doi:10.1163/15718085-12341003.
- Silva, Alexandre Pereira da (2020b). "From rocks to an archipelago: the Brazilian interpretation and application of Article 121 of the United Nations Convention on the Law of the Sea with respect to the St. Peter and St. Paul insular features". Ocean Development & International Law. 51 (4). doi:10.1080/00908320.2020.1820153.
- Themudo, Tiago Seixas; Viana, Ezequiel Francisco Carvalho (2023). "Submarino com propulsão nuclear da Marinha do Brasil: mudanças, demandas e competências". Revista da Escola Superior de Guerra. 38 (82).
- Uziel, Eduardo; Marcondes, Danilo (2021). "The peacekeeping deployment that never was: domestic considerations behind Brazil's decision not to send troops to MINUSCA". International Peacekeeping. 28 (5): 757–782. doi:10.1080/13533312.2021.1975537.
- Val, Sylvio dos Santos (2013). "A Marinha entre guerras: o esforço de reconstrução da autonomia operacional". Navigator. 9 (17). Rio de Janeiro: Serviço de Documentação da Marinha: 22–41.
- Vidigal, Armando Amorim Ferreira (July–September 1983). "A evolução do pensamento estratégico naval brasileiro". Revista Marítima Brasileira. 103 (7–9). Rio de Janeiro: Diretoria do Patrimônio Histórico e Documentação da Marinha.
- Waldmann Júnior, Ludolf (2014). "A construção naval durante a Segunda Guerra Mundial". Navigator. 10 (20). Diretoria do Patrimônio Histórico e Documentação da Marinha.
- Waldmann Júnior, Ludolf (2019). "As políticas de reaparelhamento naval da Marinha do Brasil, 1904-1945". Navigator. 15 (30). Diretoria do Patrimônio Histórico e Documentação da Marinha.

==== Monographs ====
- Almeida, Anderson da Silva (2010). Todo o leme a bombordo – marinheiros e ditadura civil-militar no Brasil: da rebelião de 1964 à Anistia (PDF) (Dissertation). Universidade Federal Fluminense. Archived from the original (PDF) on 2016-12-04.
- Conceição, Marcelo Diógenes Rocha (2012). Marinha do Brasil e Programa Netuno: excelência gerencial como meio e uma Força Armada de qualidade como fim (Dissertation). Escola Brasileira de Administração Pública e de Empresas.
- Connors, Michael E. (2005). Tudo pela pátria: the Brazilian Navy's drive to blue water (PDF) (Thesis). Naval Postgraduate School.
- Dolzan, Renata Thais Segala (2019). A formação de Marinheiros e a Educação Profissional Técnica de Nível Médio: possibilidades e direcionamentos para uma matriz curricular (PDF) (Dissertation). Programa de Pós-Graduação em Educação da Universidade Federal de Santa Catarina.
- Gonçalves, Fernando Antonio (2018). Capacitação tecnológica de militares do corpo de praças da armada para a marinha do século XXI: uma proposta de educação profissional (PDF) (Dissertation). Escola de Guerra Naval.
- Jenkins, Brent P. (1991). United States warship transfers to Argentina, Brazil, and Chile: options for U.S. policy (PDF) (Thesis). US Naval Postgraduate School.
- Lyra, Márcio de Faria Neves Pereira de (1999). Tradições do mar: usos, costumes e linguagem (PDF) (7th ed.). Brasília: Serviço de Relações Públicas da Marinha.
- Maia, Felipe Malachini (2020). O Brasil no Mar: um panorama sobre as potenciais ameaças ao seu entorno estratégico e à Amazônia Azul (PDF) (Dissertation). Escola de Guerra Naval. Archived from the original (PDF) on 2025-01-18.
- Mancuso, Amanda Pinheiro (2008). Entre terra e mar: história e política na narrativa oficial das forças armadas brasileiras – os casos do exército e da marinha (Thesis). Centro de Educação e Ciências Humanas da Universidade Federal de São Carlos.
- Marreiro, Matheus Moraes Alves (2021). As representações espaciais e a geopolítica popular no Brasil: o Atlântico Sul como uma geografia imaginativa (PDF) (Dissertation). Programa de Pós-Graduação em Segurança Internacional e Defesa da Escola Superior de Guerra.
- Marques, Adriana Aparecida (2001). Concepções de defesa nacional no Brasil: 1950-1996 (Dissertation). Universidade Estadual de Campinas.
- Menkes, Camila (2012). As relações entre habilidades sociais e estresse ocupacional em submarinistas na Marinha do Brasil (PDF) (Dissertation). Programa de Pós-Graduação em Psicologia Social da Universidade do Estado do Rio de Janeiro.
- Moraes, Emmanuelle Elise Campos de (2008). Processo de adaptação à vida militar-naval: crenças, valores e saúde (PDF) (Dissertation). Programa de Pós-Graduação em Psicologia da Universidade Federal de Santa Catarina.
- Muller, Mariana Lemos (2022). Espírito de Corpus – criação de um léxico bilíngue do Corpo de Fuzileiros Navais (PDF) (Dissertation). Programa de Pós-Graduação em Estudos da Linguagem da PUC-Rio.
- Pivatto Junior, Dilceu Roberto (2024). A construção do pensamento naval brasileiro: formulações político-estratégicas e desenvolvimento tecnológico (1967-2008) (PDF) (Thesis). Programa de Pós-Graduação em Ciência Política da Universidade Federal do Rio Grande do Sul.
- Ramos, Ana Carolina Nascimento de Albuquerque (2015). Milhas e milhas distante... Um estudo sobre a saúde do trabalhador militar embarcado em navios operativos da marinha do Brasil (PDF) (Dissertation). Faculdade de Medicina da Bahia.
- Rodrigues, Rosane Pinto (2014). Sentinelas dos mares: a carreira militar e suas representações sociais para aspirantes e oficiais da Marinha do Brasil (PDF) (Dissertation). Universidade Federal Rural do Rio de Janeiro.
- Silveira, Cláudio de Carvalho (2002). A formação dos oficiais da Marinha do Brasil: educação, profissão, pensamento estratégico (1978-2001) (Thesis). Departamento de Ciência Política da Universidade Estadual de Campinas. Archived from the original on 2024-10-08.
- Soares, Renata Cristina Ferreira (2015). O uso das forças armadas em atividades subsidiárias: o caso da Marinha do Brasil (Dissertation). Escola Brasileira de Administração Pública e de Empresas.

==== Webpages ====
- Agência Brasil (2020-07-17). "Marinha ativa Base de Submarinos da Ilha da Madeira no estado do Rio". UOL.
- Agência Marinha de Notícias (2023-08-21). "Ilha da Trindade, tesouro nacional no extremo leste da Amazônia Azul".
- Agência Marinha de Notícias (2024-09-25). "Entenda as atribuições da Autoridade Marítima brasileira exercidas pela Marinha".
- Alves, Mateus (2020-11-27). "Marinha troca nome de navio e agora tem um porta-aviões novamente". AeroIn.
- Araújo, Fernando; Oliveira, Taise; Stilben, João (2024-03-07). "'Na vanguarda que é honra e dever!': conheça a tropa de elite da Marinha do Brasil". Agência Marinha de Notícias. Archived from the original on 2024-03-19.
- Assessoria da Capitania dos Portos do Paraná (2019-06-07). "154 anos da Batalha Naval do Riachuelo será celebrado na terça-feira, 11". Folha do Litoral.
- Bastos Jr., Paulo Roberto (2020-09-24). "Operação Amazônia 2020 – CECMA, uma das mais importantes unidades do EB". Revista Tecnologia & Defesa.
- Bastos Jr., Paulo Roberto (2024-09-17). "MANSUP – Mais um disparo e o programa segue rumo à sua conclusão". Tecnologia & Defesa.
- Barreira, Victor (2025-03-25). "Brazilian marines establish coastal defence missile capability". Janes Defence Insights.
- Caiafa, Roberto (2017-10-03). "Esquadrão VF-1 – 19 anos de problemas?". Tecnologia & Defesa.
- Caiafa, Roberto (2025-05-30). "Caças AF-1 Falcão modernizados, programa de atualização da Marinha completa 10 anos em 2025". InfoDefensa.
- Caiafa, Roberto (2025-12-11). "Drones de emprego militar: uma revolução discreta está em curso na Marinha do Brasil". InfoDefensa.
- Carvalho, Luciano Franklin de (2022-08-26). "No ar, os homens do mar: conheça as cinco fases da Aviação Naval". Agência Marinha de Notícias. Archived from the original on 2022-08-26.
- Carlôto, Yan (2022-08-25). "Faróis: luzes que guiam os navegantes na Amazônia Azul". Agência Marinha de Notícias.
- "Comandante da Marinha". Marinha do Brasil. 2025-08-25.
- Comando da Força de Submarinos (2021-07-12). "Ordem do Dia: 107 anos da Força de Submarinos". Defesa Aérea & Naval.
- Controladoria-Geral da União (2026). "Comando da Marinha". Portal da Transparência.
- "Crude oil including lease condensate production 2024". U.S. Energy Information Administration.
- Godoy, Marcelo (2025-11-26). "Marinha recebe o 3º e submarino convencional, lança o 4º e faz a transição para construir o nuclear". O Estado de S.Paulo. Archived from the original on 2025-11-26.
- "Estrutura Organizacional". Marinha do Brasil. Archived from the original on 2025-12-05.
- "Estrutura SAR". SALVAMAR Brasil.
- Ferreira, Ezequiel (col.); Redação Forças de Defesa (2024-05-03). "Dimensionamento da Força Naval brasileira segundo a nova Estratégia de Defesa Marítima". Poder Naval.
- Galante, Alexandre; Lopes, Lopes (2014-11-10). "Poder Naval entrevista o jornalista Roberto Lopes, autor do livro 'As Garras do Cisne'". Poder Naval.
- GFP (2025). "Navy fleet by tonnage by country". GlobalFirepower.
- "História Naval". Marinha do Brasil. 2017-09-28. Archived from the original on 2020-12-03.
- Lopes, Roberto (2018-02-14). "Os dilemmas da administração Leal Ferreira na Aviação Naval". Poder Naval.
- Lopes, Roberto (2018-04-09). "Falta de Guarda Costeira obriga MB 'dual' a apoiar polícia anti-pirataria". Poder Naval.
- Maia, Paulo (2023-12-11). "O declínio do Poder Naval – Uma ameaça à sobrevivência nacional". Tecnologia & Defesa.
- Maia, Paulo (2025-09-11). "Classe Albion, a história do futuro NDM Oiapoque". Tecnologia & Defesa.
- Martini, Fernando Ribas de (2017-12-18). "Onde ficam e quais são os 102 navios da Marinha". Poder Naval.
- "Meios Navais". Marinha do Brasil. Archived from the original on 2025-12-10.
- "Brasilia's pride: why Brazil can't make effective use of its second hand European carrier warships HMS Ocean and Clemenceau". Military Watch. 2018-04-07.
- Motta, Sergio Barreto (2014-03-20). "Submarinos exaurem verbas da Marinha". Monitor Mercantil via Portos e Navios.
- Moralez, João Paulo (2023-11-06). "A vez dos veículos não tripulados para a Marinha do Brasil". Tecnologia & Defesa.
- Moralez, João Paulo (2025-08-19). "Exclusivo: Conheça os novos helicópteros da UH/IH-18 da Marinha do Brasil". Tecnologia & Defesa.
- "Mulher na Marinha". Marinha do Brasil. 2025-01-31.
- Orbaiceta, Gonzalo Vázquez (2023-04-14). "Aspiraciones atlánticas y progreso naval de la Marinha do Brasil". Center for Global Affairs (Universidad de Navarra).
- "Outros museus da Marinha do Brasil". Diretoria de Patrimônio Histórico e Documentação da Marinha do Brasil. Archived from the original on 2024-11-12.
- Poggio, Guilherme (2020-06-08). "O renascimento da Aviação Naval Brasileira". Poder Naval.
- Portella, Thais; Isquierdo, Melina (2023-11-02). "Comando do 7º Distrito Naval: a Marinha no coração do Brasil". Agência Marinha de Notícias.
- "Postos e Graduações". Marinha do Brasil. 2024-12-15.
- Pryce, Paul (2015-01-27). "The Brazilian Navy: green water or blue?". Offiziere.ch via Center for International Maritime Security.
- Rodrigues, Thiago (2023-03-10). "O novo blindado da Marinha. O destino das Forças Armadas é ser polícia?". Le Monde diplomatique.
- Serviço de Seleção do Pessoal da Marinha. "A Marinha do Brasil e a Marinha Mercante são a mesma instituição?". Archived from the original on 2022-08-15.
- SIATT (2024-12-18). "MANSUP foi lançado pelo ASTROS". Tecnologia & Defesa.
- "Brazil might get nuclear-powered submarines even before Australia". The Economist. 2021-09-27.
- UOL (2021-10-22). "Cisne Branco: navio da Marinha que colidiu com ponte leva nome de hino". UOL Internacional.
- Wiltgen, Guilherme (2021-05-07). "Marinha do Brasil lança nova logomarca". Defesa Aérea & Naval.
- Wiltgen, Guilherme (2025-02-20). "A SIATT e a Marinha do Brasil assinam Accordo de Desenvolvimento dos Mísseis Superfície-Ar e Ar-Superfície". Defesa Aérea & Naval.
