= History of the Brazilian Navy =

From 1822 onwards

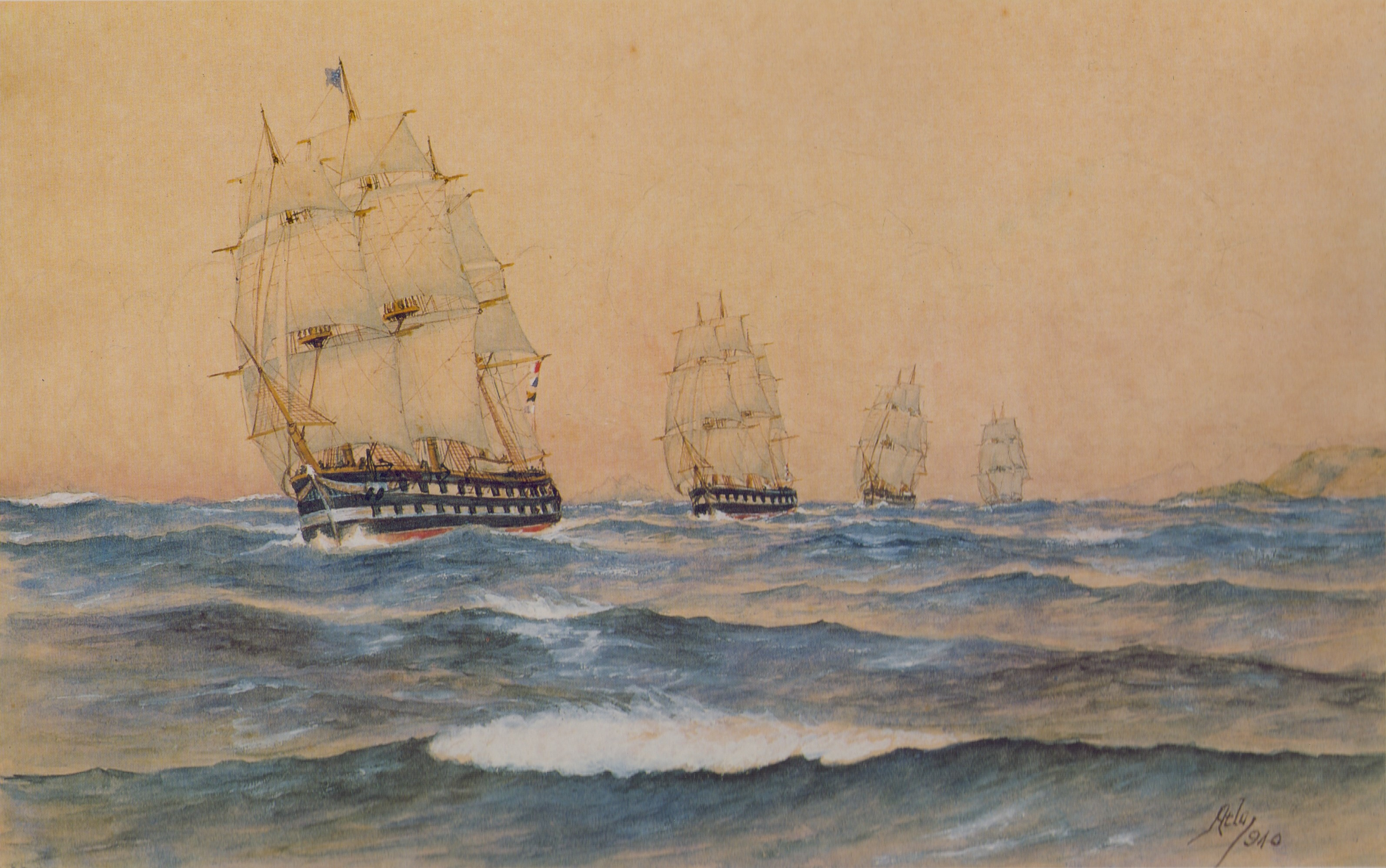
The first Brazilian squadron in 1822, by Trajano Augusto de Carvalho

The history of the Brazilian Navy begins with the adhesion of sections of the Portuguese Navy to newly independent Brazil in 1822. The Imperial Brazilian Navy was crucial to the consolidation of the Brazilian Empire and its campaigns against neighboring countries in the River Plate basin, at a time when land infrastructure was minimal. The main external influence was the Royal Navy. By the end of the Paraguayan War in 1870, Brazil was the fifth country in the world in terms of the number of ships, although this force was primarily riverine. Shipbuilding was significant, but it failed to keep pace with technological advances. The Proclamation of the Republic and the Naval Revolts gave political primacy to the Army, and the Navy entered the 20th century in decline.

In 1910, Brazil's incorporation of two powerful dreadnoughts and other ships ordered from Great Britain triggered a naval arms race with its main rival, the Argentine Navy, and the other regional power, the Chilean Navy. External dependence for maintenance prevented the full exploitation of the new ships, and the social divide between officers and enlisted men resulted in the Revolt of the Lash. Brazil entered both world wars after German submarine attacks on its merchant navy. In both conflicts, it basically had the Fleet of 1910 (although shipbuilding began to recover in the 1932 naval program). The forces in operation were subordinated to other Atlantic powers, first Great Britain and then the United States. An American naval mission, hired in 1922, and the shared experience in the Second World War placed the U.S. as the main external influence.

At the beginning of the Cold War, the Navy was equipped with surplus U.S. Navy vessels and geared towards a hypothetical anti-submarine campaign against the Soviet Navy. An aircraft carrier (Minas Gerais) emerged, although lacking attack aircraft, along with amphibious capabilities for the Marine Corps. The social question within the hierarchy was the basis for another revolt in 1964, an immediate factor in the military coup that same year. The naval programs of 1967 and 1977 represented a movement for greater autonomy, in a cycle of expansion that culminated in 1980.

At the end of the 20th century, traditional threats disappeared and new commitments were made in Antarctica, Africa, and with Argentina itself. However, the political and economic situation slowed down the projects until 2009. Under the optimism surrounding the resources of the continental shelf, a plan was drawn up to acquire two aircraft carriers, six nuclear submarines, and numerous other units. It never left the drawing board, but several shipbuilding projects continue, while other gaps in the naval inventory continue to be filled by purchases abroad. This does not compensate for the decrease in the number of assets that has occurred in the first decades of the 21st century.

== Origins ==
Since the discovery of Brazil, naval power was what connected the colony to the seat of the Portuguese Empire. In centuries of battles fought by Portugal for possession and control of Brazilian waters, the participation of the local population grew increasingly important. As the ships were made of wood, domestic shipbuilding was carried out, although artillery came from Europe. The transfer of the Portuguese Court to Brazil in 1808 led to the Portuguese Navy establishing itself in Rio de Janeiro with a significant part of its structure. The Brazilian Marine Corps, for example, is heir to the Royal Brigade of the Portuguese Navy.

In the Brazilian independence process in 1822, the nationalization of a portion of the force gave rise to the Brazilian Navy. Taking advantage of Portuguese ships and sailors who joined the newly formed Empire of Brazil and bodies created by King John VI of Portugal, such as the Navy Secretariat, the General Headquarters, the Intendancy and Accounting Office, the Navy Arsenal, the Royal Academy of Midshipmen, the hospital, the Audit Office, the Supreme Military Council, the Gunpowder Factory, the Timber Yards, and others, a native-born Brazilian, Captain Luís da Cunha Moreira, was appointed first Minister of the Navy on 28 October 1822. Foreign officers completed the staff, among them the first admiral, Lord Thomas Cochrane. The doctrine, practices and tradition would be strongly influenced by the Royal Navy in the following century.

== Empire of Brazil ==
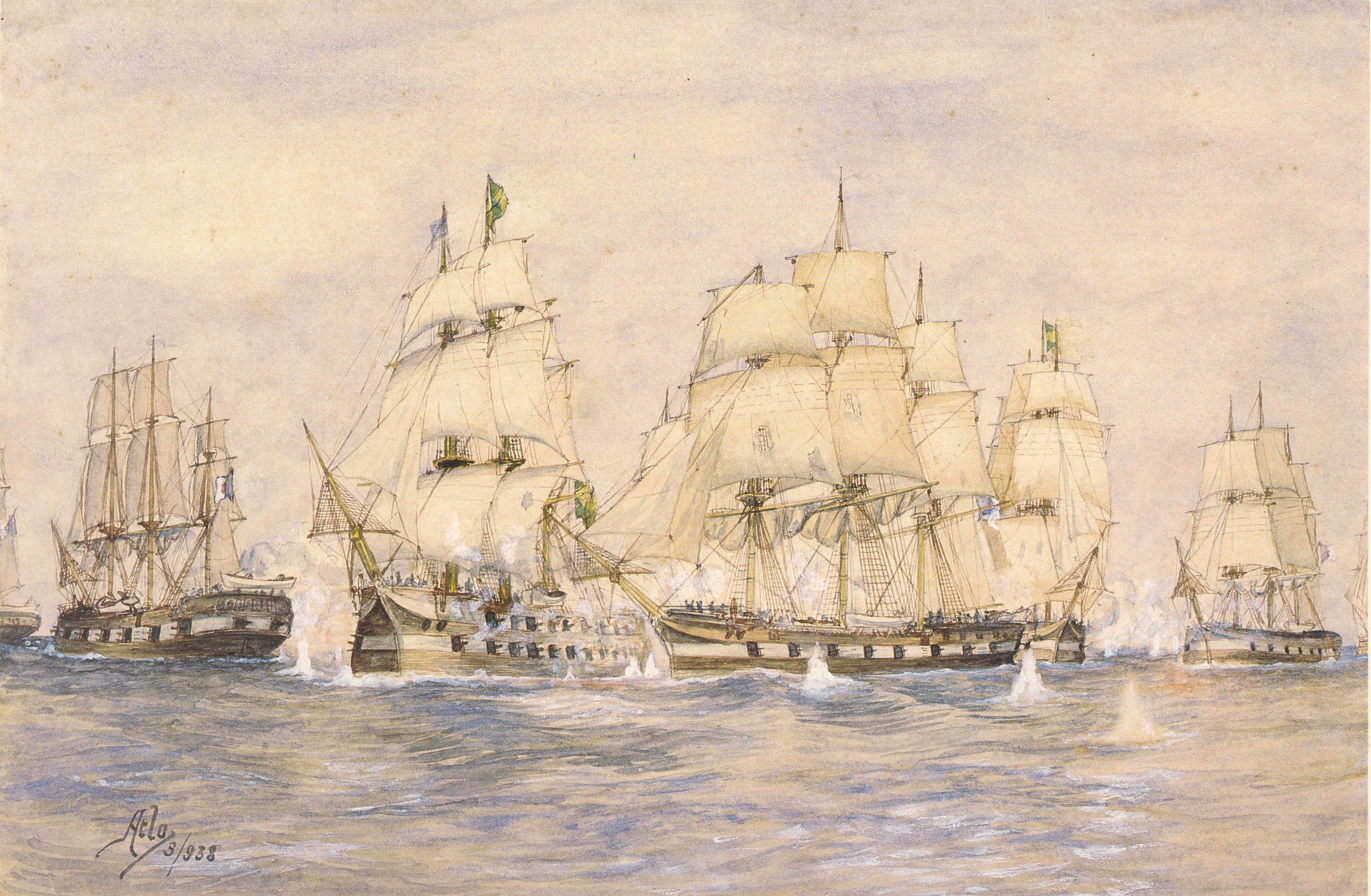
The battle of 4 May 1823, with the Imperial Navy led by Thomas Cochrane, during the Independence of Bahia

The first task was to expel the remaining Portuguese bases on the Brazilian coast in Belém (Pará), São Luís, Recife, Salvador, and Montevideo, which was achieved in 1823. Only the Navy could transport and supply the Army on the battlefronts, cut off enemy communication lines through blockade and privateering, and defend its own from opposing privateers; all typical naval tasks of the period, which would be seen in subsequent conflicts. In an "archipelago" country like Brazil, with the entire population living along the coast and navigable rivers, there was no logistical alternative. In the national economy, the merchant marine, ports, and shipbuilding were significant.

The Navy supported the Brazilian monarchy. Its participation in the independence and in suppressing internal revolts — the Confederation of the Equator of 1824 and the "civil war" of the Regency Period (1831–1840) — was a matter of national integrity. Although the only rebels with naval forces were the Ragamuffins, naval logistics were nonetheless decisive. By 1831 the fleet had grown to two ships of the line, ten frigates, twenty corvettes, seventeen brig-schooners, two gunboats, twelve bombardiers, three steam barges, fourteen transport ships and several large launches, totaling at least eighty warships. After the full adoption of steam propulsion, in the 1860s, there were forty ships with more than 250 guns.

The Imperial Navy's apogee was during the Second Reign (1841–1889). The officer corps was already composed entirely of native-born Brazilians in the 1860s, among them leaders enlisted in the War of Independence, such as Joaquim Marques Lisboa, the Marquess of Tamandaré, Francisco Manuel Barroso da Silva, the Baron of Amazonas, and Joaquim José Inácio de Barros, the Viscount of Inhaúma. For the base of the hierarchical pyramid, recruitment, initially provided by volunteering and forced recruitment ("blood tax"), was complemented by the Apprentice-Sailor Companies, through which it was expected to improve the quality of personnel. Even so, issues of indiscipline and desertion and the practice of corporal punishment did not disappear. The hierarchical relations in the Navy mirrored Brazil's slave-owning society.

=== Foreign policy ===
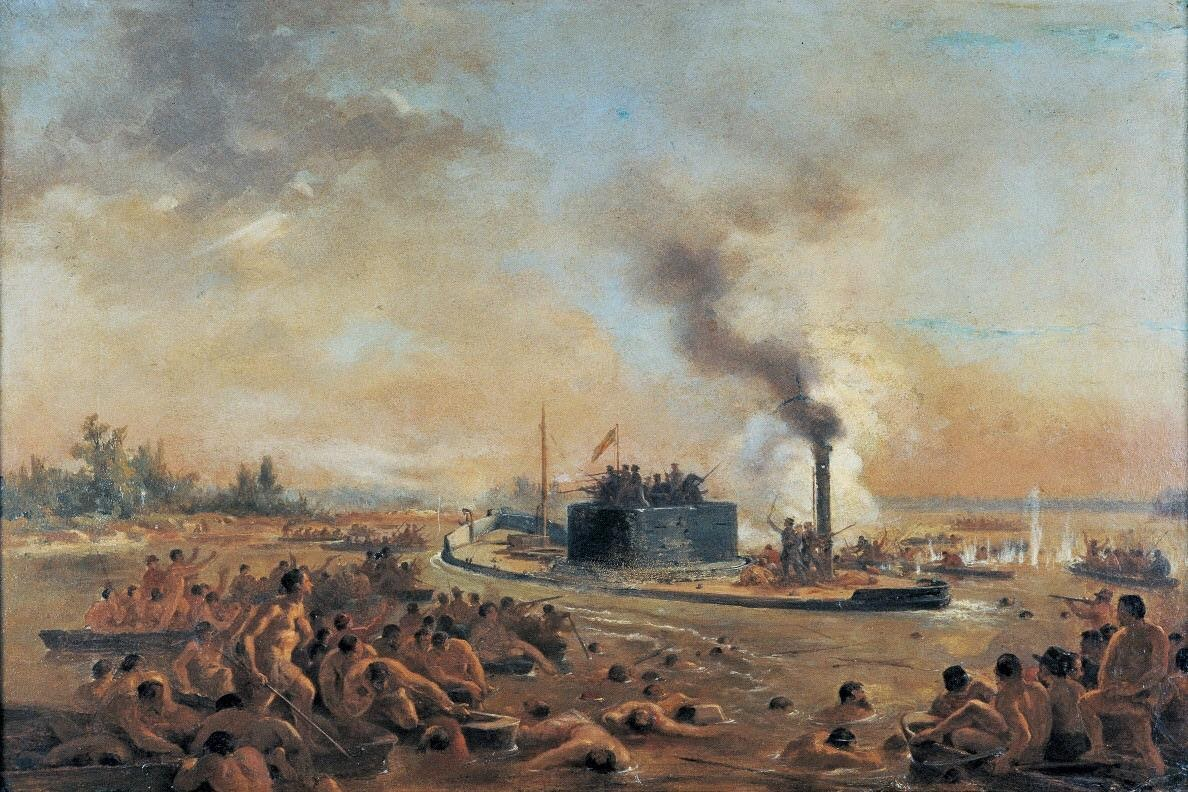
Boarding of a Brazilian monitor by Paraguayan canoes during the Passage of Humaitá in 1868

Foreign policy focused on the wars in the River Plate basin — the Cisplatine War (1825–1828), the Platine War (1851–1852), and the Paraguayan War (1864–1870). The Brazilian naval dominance achieved in the mid-century was the mainstay of imperial foreign policy, which sought to maintain two buffer states, Uruguay and Paraguay, on the border with its biggest rival, Argentina, and river access routes to the province of Mato Grosso. A second basin needed to be defended, that of the Amazon River, where a flotilla was installed in 1868, in response to the river's opening to international trade. Another junction of naval and foreign policies was in the repression of the slave trade, a point of friction with the British Empire.

Notable among these campaigns were the blockade of the port of Buenos Aires in the Cisplatine War, the passage of Tonelero on the Paraná River in 1851, the Battle of Riachuelo in 1865, and the forced passages of fortified banks at Curupayty and Humaitá. This last campaign, in Paraguay, was the largest war in South America and its battles are the highlights of Brazil's naval combat history. For the terrain of the Paraná, Paraguay and Uruguay rivers, it was necessary to create a new fleet and keep it supplied at a great distance from Rio de Janeiro. Maintenance and the climate were difficult, and disease killed more than enemy action. The Paraguayans had guns installed on the riverbanks and boarded ships with canoes, fighting with melee weapons on the decks. The Navy, together with the Army, gradually moved up the rivers. Without the river campaign, it would have been very difficult to hold southern Mato Grosso, to which there was no land connection.

=== Fall of the Empire ===
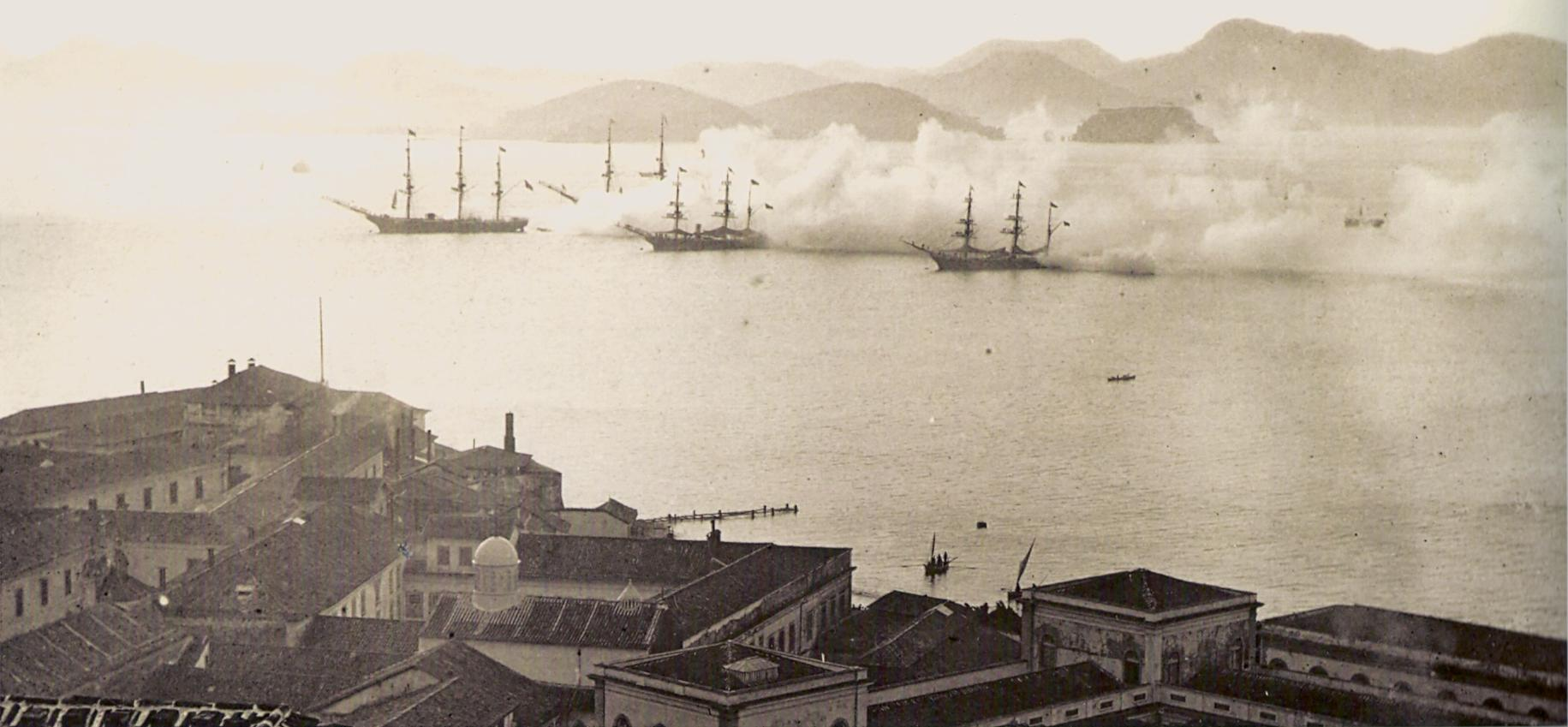
The Imperial Navy in training in the 1870s

After the Paraguayan War was won in 1870, the Brazilian Navy was the fifth largest in the world in terms of number of ships. However, it was an outdated (wooden) fleet, essentially suited to river operations. Technological advances no longer allowed a non-industrialized country to sustain a modern fleet on its own. There were Navy Arsenals in Rio de Janeiro, Bahia, Pernambuco, Pará and Mato Grosso, building iron-hulled ships, but Brazil was beginning its transition to a ship-importing country. At the same time, the cycle of external wars was ending, diminishing political interest in naval power. Some extraordinary resources were still provided due to border tensions with Argentina and Chilean rearmament. In 1888, the fleet consisted of seventeen ships: three battleships, three river battleships, three monitors, two wooden-hulled corvettes, and five hybrid cruisers (sometimes called cruisers, sometimes armored corvettes). Eleven were built domestically. It was still a considerable force with extensive infrastructure.

The Navy's officer corps, aristocratic, isolated, and little influenced by positivism, differed socially from the Army's officer corps. (Note: At the end of the Empire, naval officers represented the upper middle class and the aristocracy, while Army officers were drawn from the lower middle class. The journalist Tobias Monteiro observed in 1917 that the sons of wealthy families wanted to become doctors of Law, Medicine, or Engineering and, failing that, perhaps naval officers. Nelson Werneck Sodré described a naval force "sealed under a glass dome, since the revolt of 1893, with reduced manpower and discriminatory recruitment of its officer corps, having turned the worship of Saldanha into its household cult".) It was the Army that took the initiative to proclaim the Republic in a military coup on 15 November 1889. The Republic began with two Naval Revolts, in 1891 and 1893–1895, led by Admirals Custódio de Melo and Saldanha da Gama against Presidents-Marshals Deodoro da Fonseca and Floriano Peixoto. The former was successful, and the latter was defeated by a "paper squadron", bought under emergency conditions. The post-civil war amnesty did not immediately erase the resentments between naval commanders opposed to and in favor of the movement. From that moment on, the Army would have political hegemony in the Republic.

== First Brazilian Republic ==
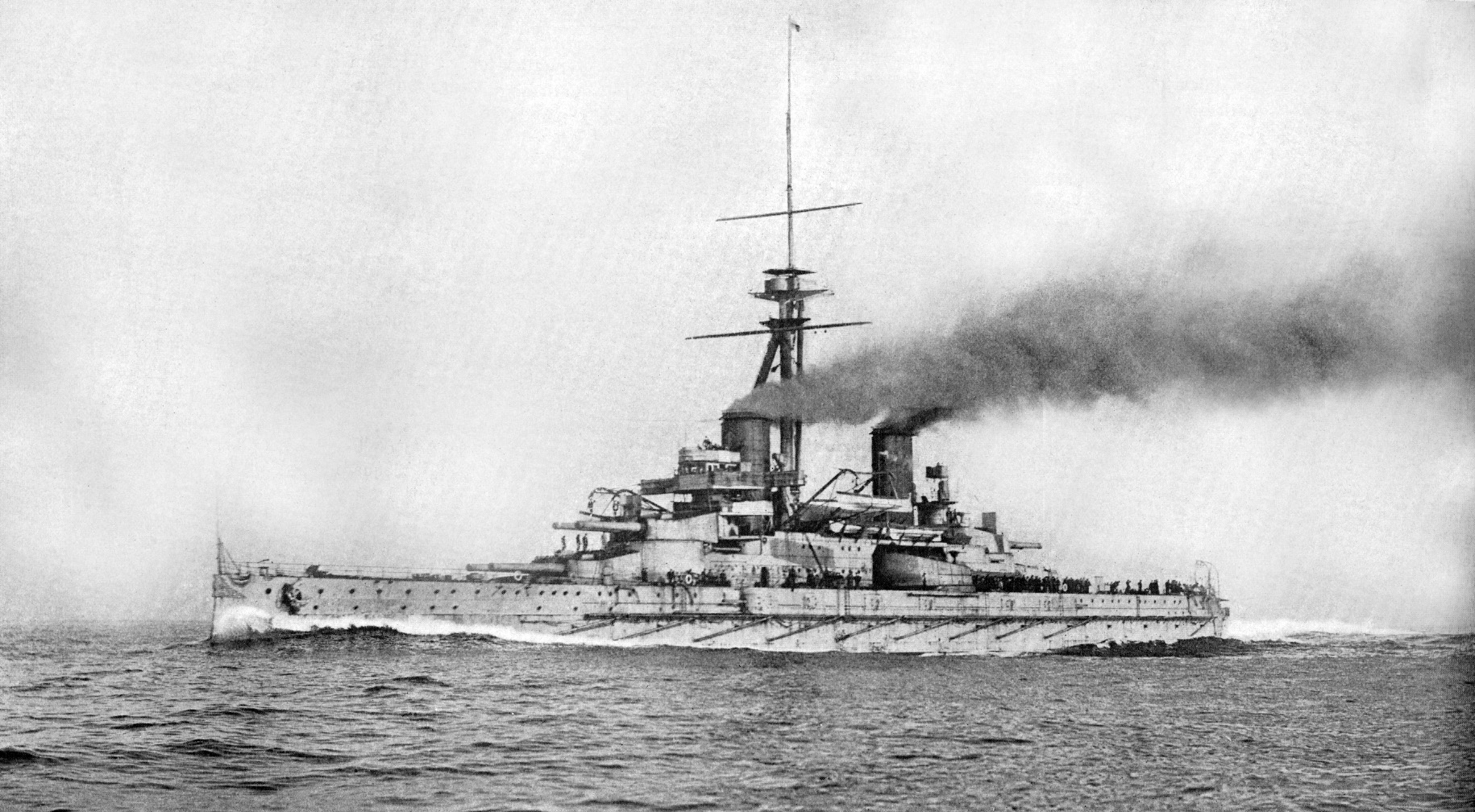
The battleship Minas Geraes, flagship of the "Fleet of 1910", which ushered in the era of big guns in Brazil, triggered a naval arms race, and remained in service until the Second World War

The last decade of the 19th century witnessed a progressive demobilization and the succession of four Navy Ministers in just six years. Shipbuilding virtually stopped, and would remain so for many decades. In the continental strategic balance, which revolved around the three "ABC countries", Argentina and Chile gained a large qualitative superiority over Brazil. The decline of naval power became the subject of public debate among politicians, journalists and officers. Thinkers such as Alfred Mahan and the French proponents of the Jeune École resonated in these discussions.

The consolidation of the Oligarchic Republic, the rise of the coffee and rubber cycles and the interest of the Minister of Foreign Affairs, the Baron of Rio Branco, in naval power as an instrument of foreign policy were the political conditions for the "Fleet of 1910". Ordered from British shipyards, it consisted of the dreadnoughts Minas Geraes and São Paulo, the cruisers Bahia and Rio Grande do Sul, and ten Pará class destroyers. The same program also incorporated three F class submarines in 1913 and auxiliary ships.

The Brazilian Navy was making a technological leap into the era of large guns. The pair of battleships, the most powerful in the world at the time they were launched, triggered a naval arms race with Argentina and Chile, each ordering dreadnoughts of even greater tonnage and guns than the Brazilian ones. In a short time, the Fleet of 1910 was inferior even in its region. The industrial and human backwardness and external dependence for maintenance, all stemming from the country's structural economic and education deficiencies, prevented the acquired ships from being fully utilized. Naval administration was personalistic, officers had excessively theoretical training, and there was a shortage of sailors for specialized functions.

In the personnel structure, there was a strong dualism between the elitist officer corps and the sailors, seen as the "dregs of society". (Note: According to the ministerial report of 1910, the Apprentices Schools "found in police jails the greatest source for the enlistment of personnel".) Hierarchical relations were tinged with racism and corporal punishment. The sailors, led by João Cândido, reacted in the Revolt of the Lash in 1910. Seizing part of the fleet, including the battleships, they threatened to bombard the city of Rio de Janeiro. The demand would eventually be met: corporal punishment would no longer be applied. The official narrative of events is negative towards the rebels. The 1997 volume of Brazilian Naval History, while echoing this view, acknowledges the rebels' "fair cause" and points to the need for professionalization of the Navy at that time.

=== World War I ===
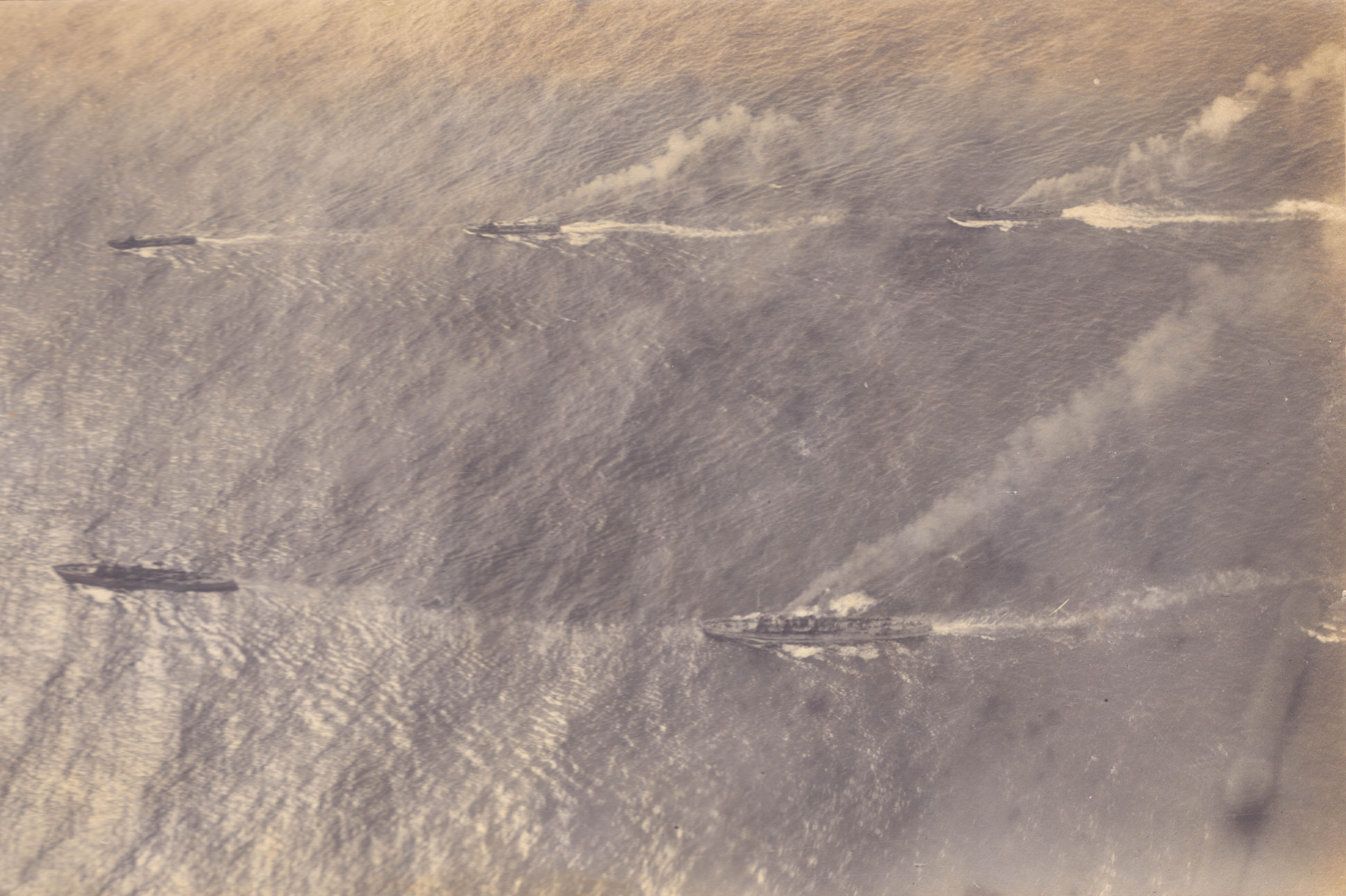
The DNOG returning to Rio de Janeiro (1919)

The technical responsibilities assumed with the "Fleet of 1910" exceeded Brazilian capabilities. When the First World War began in 1914, Brazil declared itself neutral. External dependence took its toll: foreign industries, mobilized for the war in Europe, could not supply materiel for maintenance. Spare parts and even coal were lacking. On the other hand, it was during this period, in August 1916, that Naval Aviation was created.

The fleet was reorganized into patrol divisions in the North, Center and South of the coast. After attacks by German submarines against Brazilian merchant ships, Brazil formally declared war on the German Empire on 26 October 1917. Brazilian participation involved sending the Naval Division in War Operations (DNOG) to the Mediterranean theater of operations and twelve pilots to the Royal Air Force. The DNOG operated under orders from the British Admiralty in protecting maritime traffic. Its crew would be severely affected by the Spanish flu, suffering many casualties. What was gained from the campaign was tactical learning, a great advance in relation to the procedures inherited from the 19th century.

=== Post-World War I ===
The interwar period was one of renewed neglect of the Navy, (Note: Initially, it was expected to renew the fleet by taking advantage of Anglo-American rivalry and the availability of surplus ships. The pacifist climate of naval disarmament agreements, such as the Washington Naval Treaty (1922), combined with a restricted budget and military revolts, limited major acquisitions in the period 1918–1930 to the destroyer Maranhão, former HMS Porpoise, and the submarine Humaytá.) and at the same time, of profound reforms, despite economic difficulties. President Epitácio Pessoa hired a naval advisory mission in the U.S., contradicting the strong Anglophile sentiment still present in the officer corps. Thus began an era of American influence in the Brazilian Navy. In the year of the contract, 1922, Brazil had seventeen main ships, inherited from Alexandrino Faria de Alencar's naval program, and some coastal vessels from the end of the previous century. In total, they displaced 59,193 tons, compared to Argentina, with 29 main ships and 108,137 tons, and Chile, with thirty ships and 79,528 tons. None of the three navies projected power in the high seas, but the Brazilian Navy was clearly inferior.

The tenentist military revolts of the 1920s stirred segments of the Navy, although with less impact than in the Army. The social background of Navy officers linked them better to the civilian political elites. The naval force was loyalist, but not entirely reliable. In defense of the government, it participated in the suppression of revolts in Rio de Janeiro, São Paulo, Amazonas, and Pará, among others, but it also led rebellions itself, including an uprising in the battleship São Paulo in 1924. Loyalist victories resulted in hundreds of prisoners, some of whom were held on vessels requisitioned by the Navy as prison ships. A new movement against the regime, the Revolution of 1930, was successful. Naval divisions sent against the revolutionaries had no effect. A military junta was installed on 24 October with Admiral Isaías de Noronha among its members. The novelty was the joint participation of admirals and generals in a coup; unable to compete with the Army, the Navy allied itself with it.

== Vargas Era ==
The Revolution of 1930 brought Getúlio Vargas to the presidency, where he remained until 1945. The Navy blockaded the port of Santos and sent marines to the Paraíba Valley in defense of the government during the Constitutionalist Revolution of 1932. Despite the economic difficulties of the Great Depression, Vargas needed military support. In the same year, he approved funding for a modest naval program aimed at regaining parity with Argentina and Chile. Naval policy was not well defined and generally prioritized surface operations. The novelty was the reactivation of shipbuilding after decades of neglect, which coincided with the government's industrialization policy.

Vargas established a dictatorship with the support of the Armed Forces in 1937, the Estado Novo, and faced another insurrection the following year, attempted by the Integralists, including many Navy officers and enlisted men. A rearrangement of the political-military support base, quite controversial in the Navy, was made in 1941, when Naval Aviation and its equivalent in the Army were abolished to create a third branch in the Armed Forces, the Brazilian Air Force.

=== World War II ===
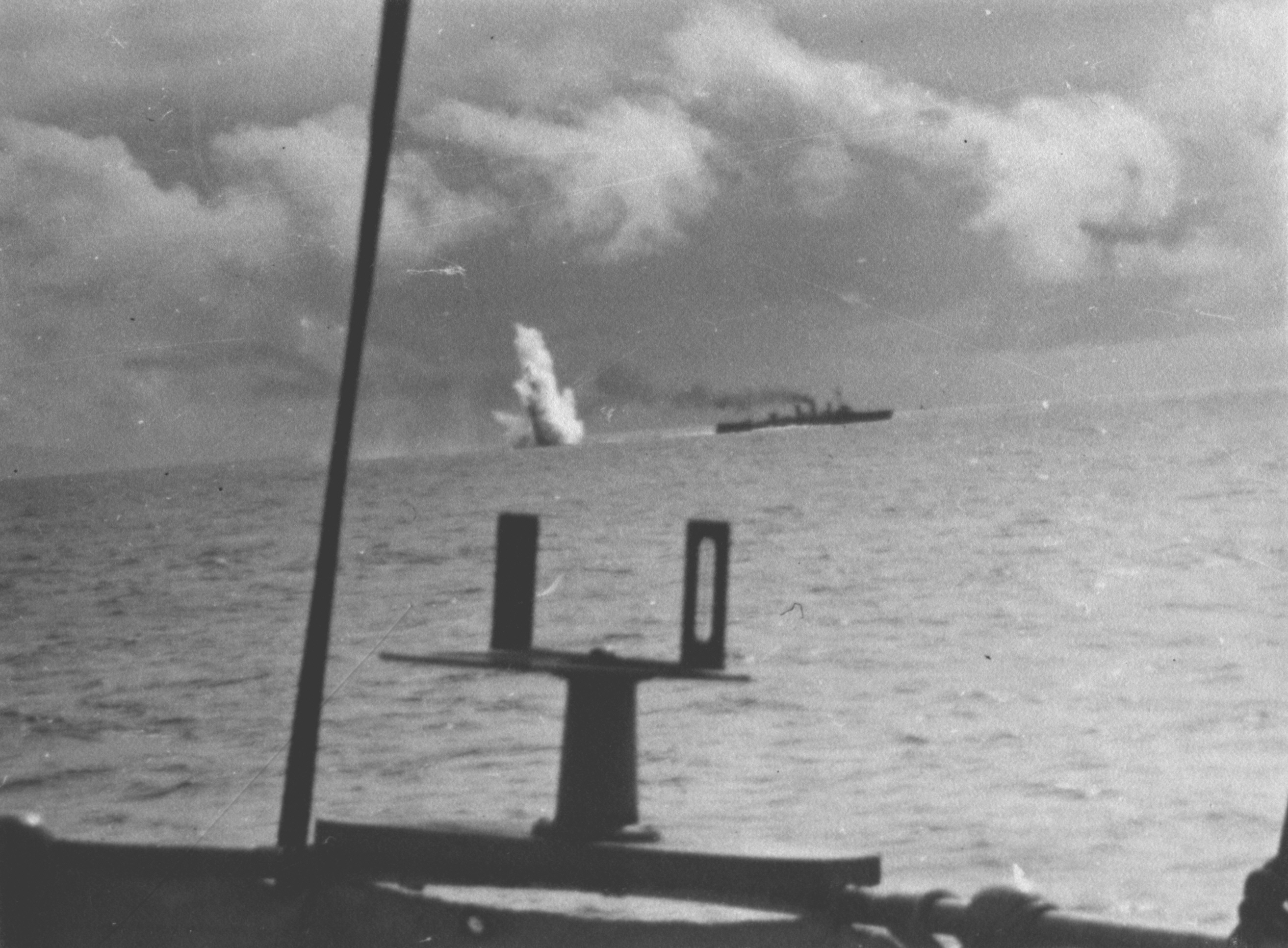
Launch of a depth charge by the cruiser Bahia, a remnant of the Fleet of 1910, during the anti-submarine campaign to defend maritime traffic

The outbreak of World War II in Europe in 1939 cut off access to European suppliers, including an order for destroyers under construction in Great Britain. The Brazilian Navy was more favorable to the Allies than the Army, but its political influence was less. Axis submarine attacks on maritime trade brought American air and naval bases to Brazilian territory and Brazil's entry into the war in 1942. The Americans themselves had plans to take the bases by force if Brazil did not consent, and did not expect much resistance. The fleet was still basically what remained from 1910. The scarcity of land communications left the supply of raw materials to the Allies and the supply of large coastal cities at the mercy of the experienced German submarine force.

There were no radars, sonars and other equipment appropriate for anti-submarine warfare. Through the American Lend-Lease program, existing ships were adapted and Brazil received sixteen submarine chasers and eight escort destroyers of the Bertioga class. Although small, they were modern ships for the mission of defending maritime traffic. Shipbuilding continued: from 1937 to 1946 Brazilian shipyards launched two monitors, six minelayers and nine destroyers, three Marcílio Dias class ones and six of the Amazonas class. The new cycle of expansion culminated in 1945. Parity of forces with Argentina was achieved.

In the Northeast, the Brazilian air and naval forces were placed under the sole command of the U.S. Another Brazilian patrol group operated in the southern part of the coast. The main operations were escorting convoys on the stretch between Rio de Janeiro and Trinidad, in the Caribbean, with other missions such as escorting the Brazilian Expeditionary Force on its way to Europe. The old battleships served as artillery platforms in Recife and Salvador. By the end of the war, the Brazilian Navy had escorted 3,164 ships and lost three ships and 486 military personnel.

== Fourth Brazilian Republic ==
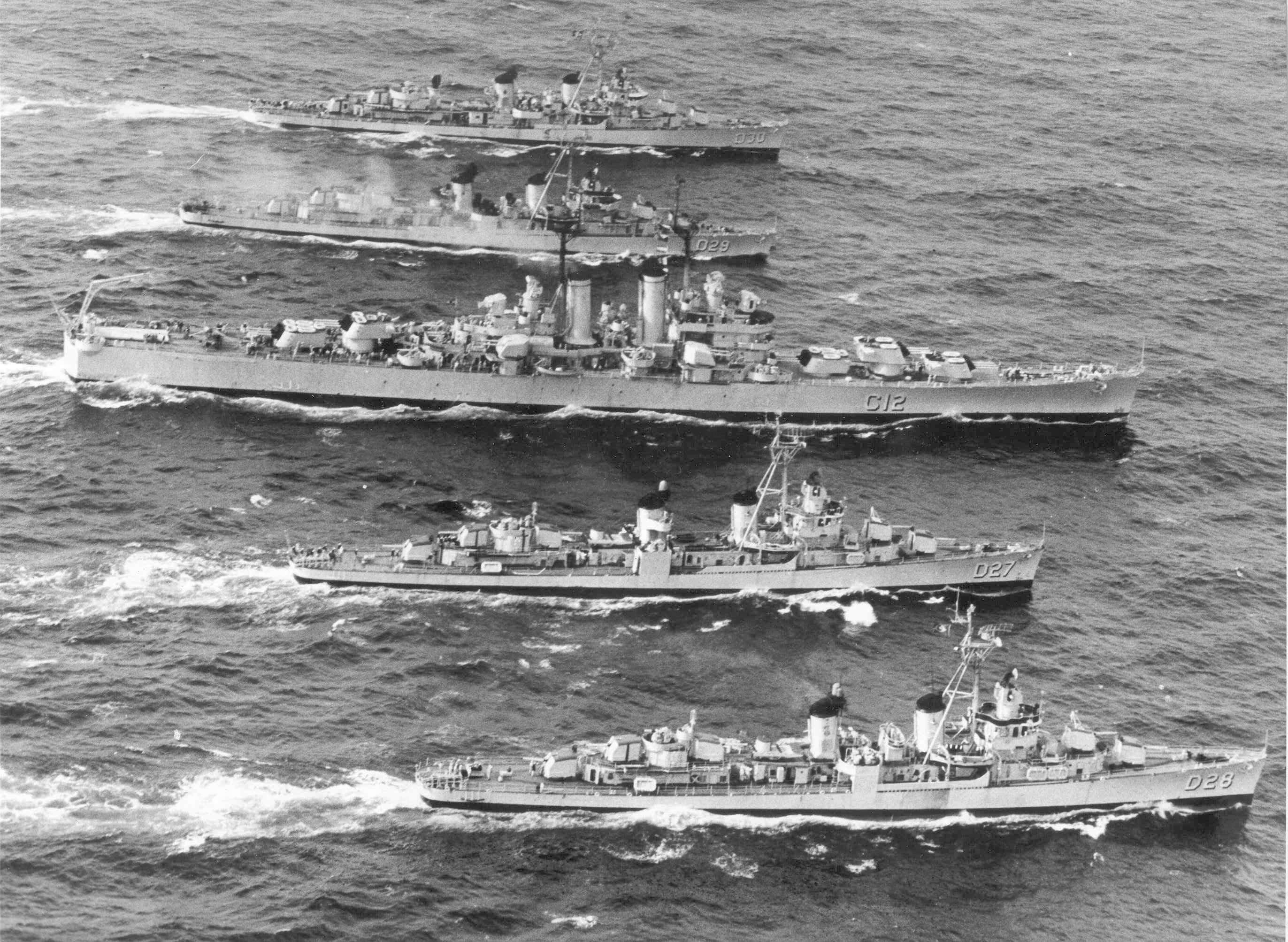
Cruiser Tamandaré, at the center, in a task force with destroyers, all of American origin, during the "Lobster War"

In the postwar period, the perception of threat was low in South America and increasing in the Atlantic. Brazil joined the Organization of American States (OAS) and the Inter-American Treaty of Reciprocal Assistance. This Western Hemisphere collective defense system had a leader, the United States, and an implicit enemy, the Eastern bloc of the Cold War. For regional navies, Soviet submarines replaced the Germans. The highest priority for the next few decades would be preparation for anti-submarine warfare.

Expectations of preferential treatment by the Americans were dashed in 1951, when two Brooklyn class light cruisers, Tamandaré and Barroso, were transferred to replace the old battleships. The Americans offered other counterparts to Argentina and Chile, preventing Brazil from disrupting the regional balance. Nevertheless, the following year saw the signing of the Brazil-United States Military Agreement, which provided low-cost access to surplus World War II vessels. By 1977, Brazil had received fourteen destroyers of the Fletcher, Allen M. Sumner, and Gearing classes, eleven Fleet-Type and Guppy submarines, four minesweepers, one workshop ship, and two landing ships for tanks. The shipbuilding industry was left to languish in the face of the easy supply of materials. Joint operations of Latin American navies with the US navy—Unitas, Veritas, and Springboard—spread the American tactical standard in the region, despite the technological gap.

Even in the 1950s there was a slight diversification of suppliers with the purchase of ten corvettes from the Netherlands, the Imperial Marinheiro class, two hydrographic vessels and four troop transport ships from Japan and a light aircraft carrier from the United Kingdom, the Minas Gerais, former HMS Vengeance. With the troop transports, the Marine Corps carried out its first amphibious exercises, ceasing to be a mere guard force. Minas Gerais was a tortuous path for the recreation of Naval Aviation, which faced opposition from the Air Force regarding the issue of embarked aviation. As with battleships and submarines, Brazil was the first country in the region to incorporate aircraft carriers. Argentina, without its own objections to a carrier-based attack aviation, regained its primacy in naval power by acquiring its own aircraft carrier. The "Lobster War" of 1963 highlighted the fleet's unavailability and ammunition shortage when it was necessary to confront a French naval mobilization off the coast of Northeastern Brazil. Diplomacy kept the French away without direct confrontation.

The transfer of the capital to Brasília in 1960, like the March to the West, represented the continental orientation of public policies and collective consciousness in the 20th century. In the party splits of the "Populist Republic" of 1945–1964, the opinion of the officer corps leaned towards the anti-Vargas or "UDN" side, intervening in the crises of the presidential succession in 1955, when the Navy was defeated by the Army in the November 11 Movement, and 1961, when, allied with it, it attempted to prevent the inauguration of President João Goulart. The Legality Campaign, in which sailors participated, secured Goulart's inauguration.

The sailors of this period were already a highly skilled and specialized body, but they had frustrations, such as the restriction on marriage, and lived in an environment of social vulnerability (alcoholism, prostitution, gambling, etc.). The lower ranks of the Navy participated in the 1963 Sergeants' Revolt and played a leading role in the 1964 Sailors' Revolt, a conflict between naval authorities and the Association of Sailors and Marines of Brazil (AMFNB). The officers of the three forces felt that hierarchy and discipline were in danger, which was a factor in the 1964 military coup, days later. The military junta installed by the coup included, although for a short period, Admiral Augusto Rademaker, who would also be part of the 1969 junta and reach the Vice-Presidency. Another admiral, Sílvio Heck, was part of the 1961 junta.

== Military dictatorship ==
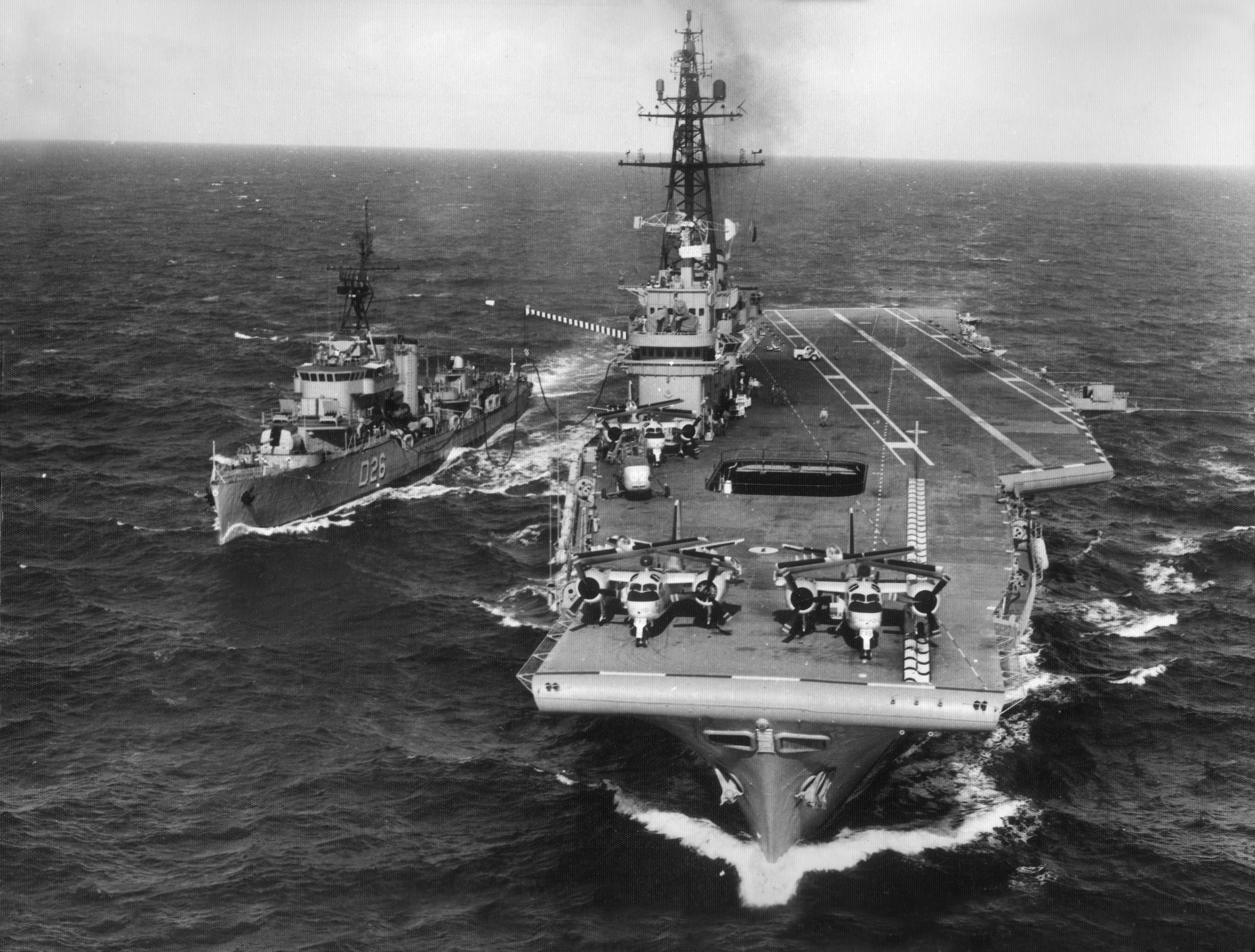
Aircraft carrier Minas Gerais, with Air Force anti-submarine aircraft on the flight deck, and the destroyer Marcílio Dias

At the beginning of the military dictatorship (1964–1985), the Navy was the force most affected by purges of military personnel associated with the deposed government. In preventing and suppressing guerrilla activity, the Navy participated in "civic-social actions" and engaged the Navy Intelligence Center (Cenimar) and the marines, some of whom fought against the Araguaia Guerrilla. The amphibious warfare doctrine advocated landings on the Brazilian coast against territories dominated by guerrillas or rebel troops. According to the National Truth Commission, the Navy ministers during this period had "political-institutional responsibility for the establishment and maintenance of structures and procedures aimed at the practice of serious human rights violations".

The embarked aviation issue was solved by President Castelo Branco in 1965: the aircraft carrier Minas Gerais began operating with Navy helicopters and Air Force anti-submarine aircraft. The 1967 naval program, implemented during the Brazilian economic miracle, innovated by acquiring ships of recent design and European suppliers: the six Niterói class frigates, the three Oberon class submarines and the six Aratu class minesweepers, among others. The Navy entered the age of missiles and informatics, and helicopters were already operating from almost all ship types. The marines stabilized at a strength of fifteen to sixteen thousand, equipped with their first armored vehicles. The Submarine Force gained tactical potential and was no longer used only to train destroyers in anti-submarine warfare. Part of the Niterói class was built at AMRJ, reviving the naval industry; during the same period, shipbuilding for the merchant marine would reach its peak. The need for autonomy in arms production was a consensus among the officer corps.

The point of contention in naval thinking, from the 1970s onwards, was whether doctrine should move away from American leadership, collective defense and anti-submarine warfare. A "yes" answer was given by a new generation of officers such as Mário César Flores, Armando Ferreira Vidigal, Alex Bastos and Henrique Saboia. In context, President Ernesto Geisel broke the Brazil-US Military Agreement in 1977 and the American Naval Mission was dismissed. Guerrilla warfare was suppressed and war with the Soviet Union seemed less likely than a regional conflict. Diplomats and military officials were interested in North-South relations. Tensions with Argentina were high, but would be eased after 1979. Oil exploration began on the Brazilian continental shelf, and the Brazilian territorial sea was unilaterally extended 200 nautical miles from the coast in 1970.

The year 1980 marked the culmination of another expansion cycle. The main assets were the Minas Gerais, eight submarines, twelve destroyers, six frigates, two amphibious ships, two tankers, and 22 patrol boats. Most were still older ships of American origin, but 38% were from the last decade and 13% were of Brazilian origin. Against a sophisticated opponent, the Brazilian Navy could have suffered a defeat comparable to that of the Argentine Navy in the Falklands War, but most South American and African navies were in a worse position, and Brazil was more autonomous in its logistics. A new naval program, designed in 1977, envisioned attack aircraft, corvettes, and submarines, but it would be implemented in the last two decades of the 20th century, a time of crisis for the Brazilian economic model, in which naval power had increasing demands for dwindling resources. (Note: "In the late 1970s and throughout the 1980s, an attempt was made to give it [the 1967 program] continuity through a 'mini-program', using the scarce resources then available, under which five domestically designed corvettes and five submarines of German design were built in the country, but with such slow disbursements that the last submarine (S Tikuna) was only launched in 2004 and the last corvette (Cv Barroso) in 2008".) It was still possible, during this period, to implement a nuclear program and the Brazilian Antarctic Program.

== New Republic ==
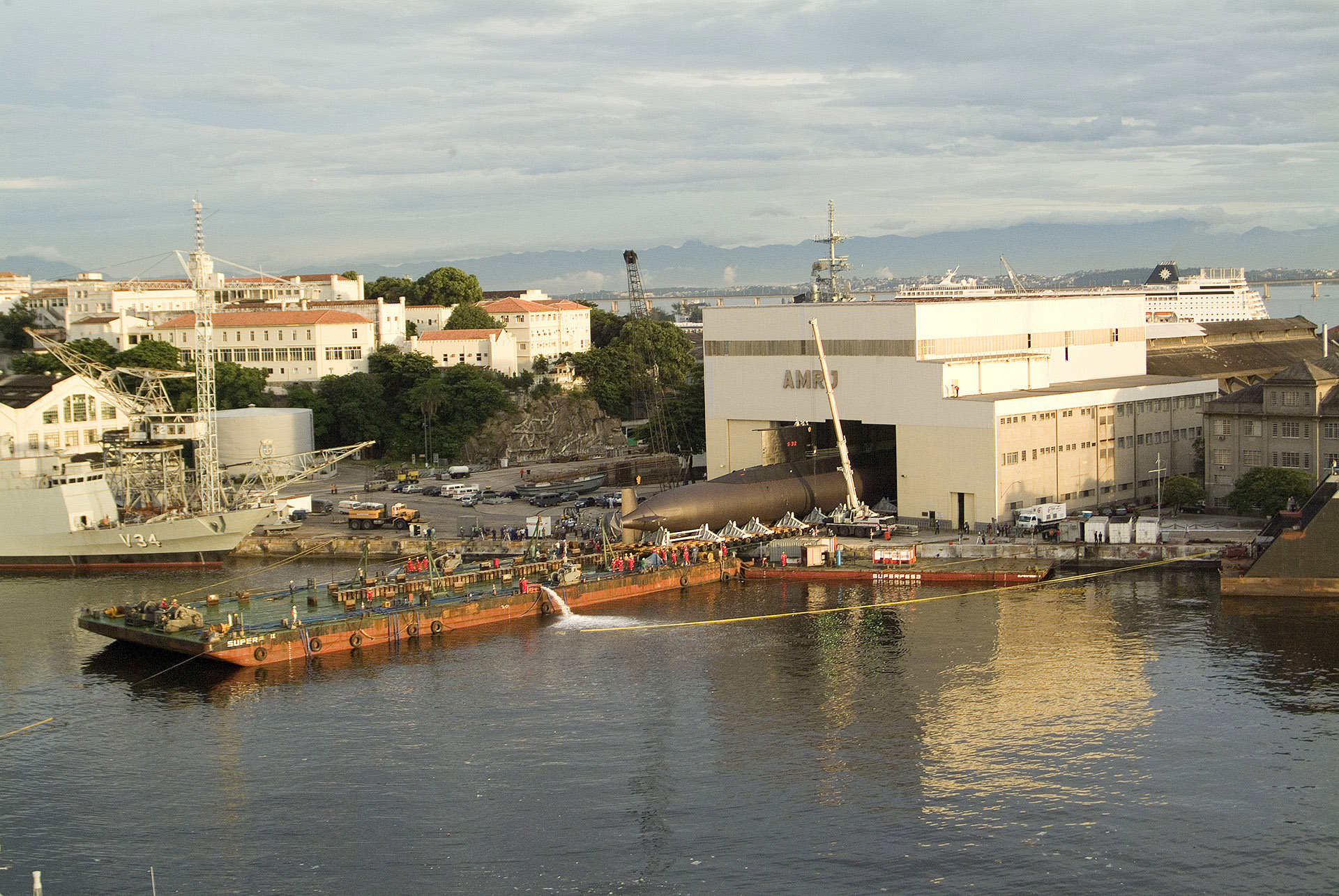
The submarine Timbira undergoing maintenance at the Rio de Janeiro Navy Arsenal, where it was built

A new democratic Constitution came into force in 1988. Non-intervention was the foreign policy guideline, which did not favor a strong fleet. The Cold War ended three years later. The Navy of the Soviet Union ceased to exist and that of Argentina went into decline. There was no longer a clear threat. Brazil has sought to fend off extra-regional powers, take leadership in the South Atlantic and get closer to Africa with the South Atlantic Peace and Cooperation Zone, cooperation with Namibia for the creation of its Navy, since 1994, and similar initiatives. With Argentina, a routine of joint exercises was developed, through which "the Navies of both countries anticipated Mercosur", according to Admiral Mário César Flores.

With the entry into force of the United Nations Convention on the Law of the Sea in 1994, the Brazilian territorial sea shrank from two hundred to twelve nautical miles, giving way to an exclusive economic zone of the same width. The occupation of the Saint Peter and Saint Paul Archipelago and geological surveys of the seabed, all in partnership between the Navy and the scientific community, allowed the expansion of the EEZ and the continental shelf in 2004. These maritime zones were branded by the political concept of the "Blue Amazon", which aims to unite society in an "effective return to Brazil's inexorable maritime destiny". The "Green" Amazon has also received attention, although the Navy, responsible for river operations, has less enthusiasm than the Army.

Under funding cuts, the Navy modernized the Niterói class and built and commissioned five Inhaúma/Barroso class corvettes in 1989–2008, out of a total of sixteen planned, and five Tupi/Tikuna class submarines in 1989–2006. Second-hand purchases returned, such as the four Garcia/Pará class destroyers, four Type 22/Greenhalgh class frigates, three amphibious ships, a tanker and the aircraft carrier São Paulo, former Foch, acquired from the French Navy in 2000 to replace the Minas Gerais. Fixed-wing Naval Aviation was reactivated with a batch of A-4 Skyhawk aircraft, but both São Paulo and these aircraft would suffer from high unavailability. In 1998 the Ministry of the Navy was demoted to Navy Command and subordinated to the new Ministry of Defense, but the Navy General Staff did not lose its autonomy in formulating naval strategy. The Navy commander in 2007, Admiral Júlio Soares de Moura Neto, admitted a "critical state of materiel and technological obsolescence".

=== National Defense Strategy ===
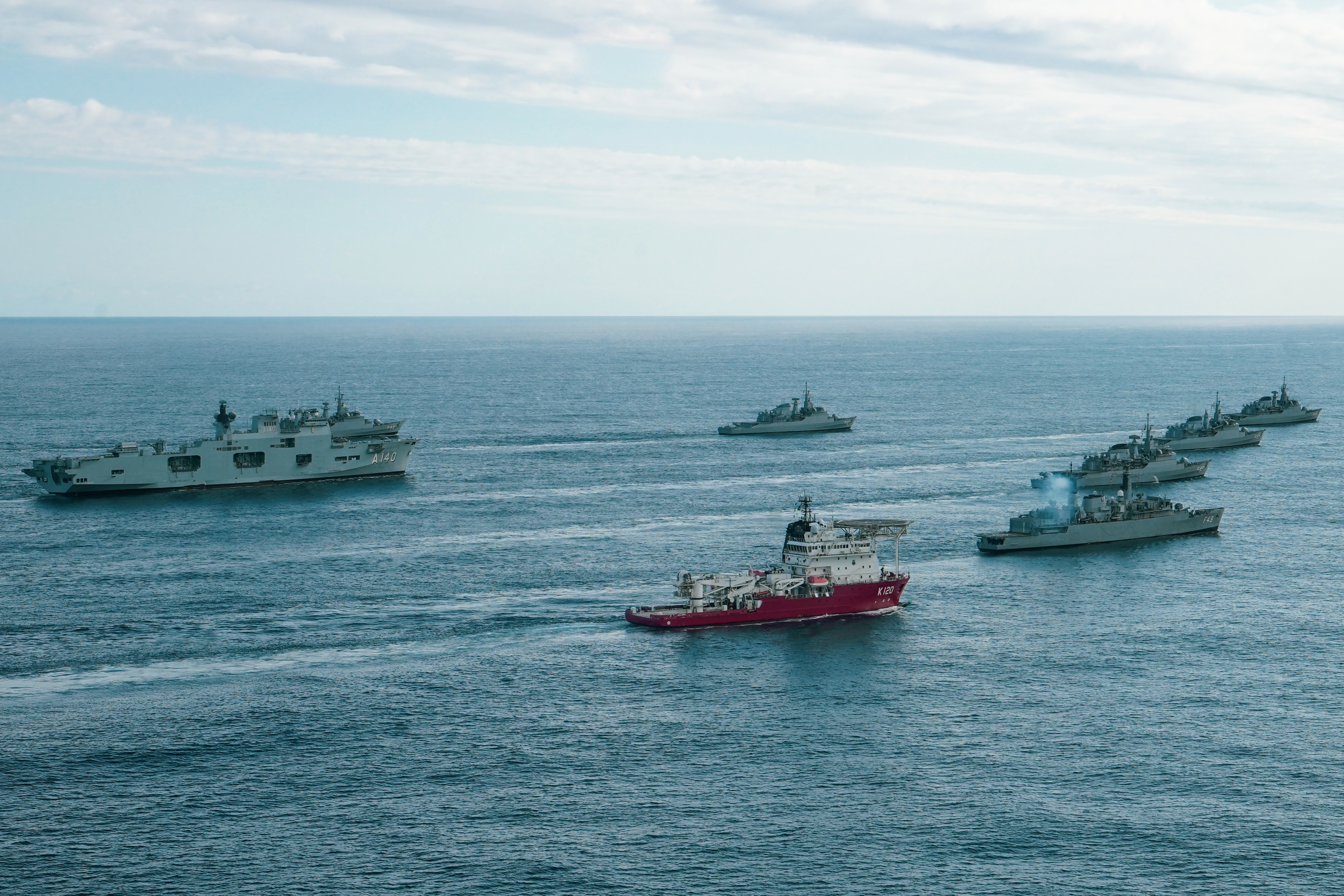
The fleet in formation in 2023, with frigates in the foreground and the helicopter carrier Atlântico in the background

In the 2000s the economic outlook was positive and large reserves of oil and natural gas were discovered in the pre-salt layer, below the continental shelf. Brazil achieved oil self-sufficiency and almost all production was offshore. The Navy, following the National Defense Strategy published by the government in 2008, developed an ambitious Organization and Equipment Plan that would practically double its size, including a 2nd Fleet to be installed in the North or Northeast, two aircraft carriers and six nuclear submarines, making maximum use of national industry. A stance of denying the use of the sea would prepare Brazil for the worst-case scenario, a war against a more powerful extra-regional power. The defense of oil platforms and coastal assets would be more important than maritime lines of communication. This priority is a novelty in Brazilian naval history, in which the projection of power and control of maritime area have always predominated.

Another economic crisis began in the following decade, and there were no financial conditions to implement this vision. Some projects went ahead, such as the Riachuelo-class submarines, the Tamandaré-class frigates, and the Amazonas-class ocean patrol vessels, and purchases of second-hand ships continued, such as the multi-purpose landing ships Bahia (2015) and Oiapoque (2025) and the helicopter carrier Atlântico. Priorities were given to submarines, Naval Aviation and the refit of São Paulo, leaving several opportunities for the purchase of escorts unfulfilled. Military officials complained about the inconsistency of funds for strategic projects, but the institution was also criticized for decisions such as extending the life of São Paulo until 2017. In the first two decades of the 21st century, decommissionings exceeded incorporations. Much of the remaining fleet in 2022 was approaching four decades old, with a further 40% projected to be decommissioned by 2028.

Naval operations in the 21st century have included search efforts, such as in the disappearances of Air France Flight 447 in 2009 and the Argentine submarine ARA San Juan (S-42) in 2017; United Nations peacekeeping missions, with marines in MINUSTAH from 2004 to 2017, and an admiral and flagship in command of UNIFIL from 2011 to 2021; and public security in national territory, under the legal institute of guaranteeing law and order, which gained visibility in the favelas of Rio de Janeiro from 2010 onwards. In the political arena, Admiral Almir Garnier Santos, commander of the Navy in 2021–2022, was arrested in 2025 following investigations into an attempted coup d'état in 2022.
