= Embarked aviation issue =

Dispute between Brazilian Navy and Air Force

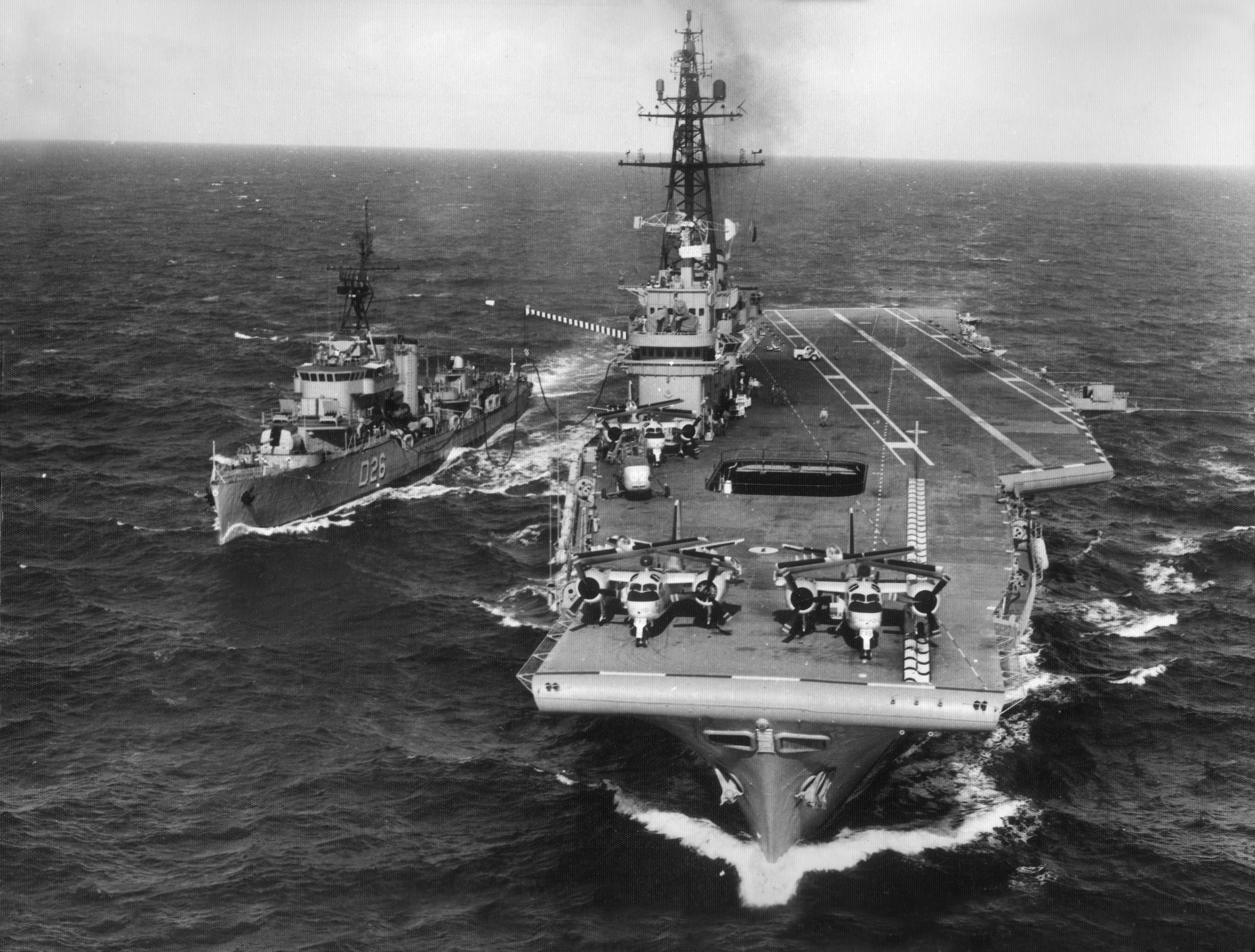
FAB P-16 Tracker planes on the deck of the NAeL Minas Gerais after the dispute was resolved

The embarked aviation issue (or embarked aviation problem) was a dispute between the Brazilian Navy (MB) and the Brazilian Air Force (FAB) over the aircraft that would operate on board the aircraft carrier Minas Gerais, acquired in 1956. The FAB wanted to maintain its monopoly of military aviation, existing since its creation in 1941 by the merger of the Army and Naval organic aviations. The MB, which had not accepted the loss of its aviation, recreated it, under strong opposition from the FAB, in the mid-1950s. The solution to the impasse was the "Castelo Branco corollary", in 1965, which legitimized Naval Aviation, but restricted it to rotary-wing aircraft (helicopters). The fixed-wing aircraft (planes) remained in the hands of the FAB, whose 1st Group of Embarked Aviation (GAE), with P-16 Tracker planes, started to operate on the aircraft carrier.

The Ministry of Aeronautics and the FAB came up with the concept of "Single Air Force", which they justified based on current legislation and resource savings; air support to the MB and the Army would be provided through cooperation with the FAB. From the MB's point of view, this cooperation was unsatisfactory and naval aviation would allow for better coordination and specialization. It had references abroad: in the post-Second World War (1939–1945), several western powers such as the United States and the United Kingdom maintained the aviation carried on aircraft carriers as part of their navies. In Brazil, the rivalry between the two branches was evident in the General Staff of the Armed Forces (EMFA) and even in newspapers of great circulation. The competition for resources and operating autonomy highlights the autarkic behavior of the Brazilian Armed Forces corporations in the period.

The MB created the Navy Aeronautics Directorate (DAerM) in 1952 and the Naval Aeronautics Instruction and Training Center (CIAAN) in 1955, already thinking about training the staff of a new naval aviation. The justification it found was the purchase of Minas Gerais, inaugurating a material and political race with the FAB to supply the personnel, helicopters and planes that would serve on board. The focus was on anti-submarine warfare capability. The FAB created the 1st GAE, which was not allowed to land on the ship, and the 2nd Liaison and Observation Squadron (ELO). The MB also managed to get pilots and maintenance personnel and aircraft, but they were technologically inferior and obtained by tricks such as landing in crates and secret assembly. Even so, the information reached the press and was disclosed with great controversy. Naval Aviation was not recognized by the air traffic control of the Department of Civil Aviation, managed by the Ministry of Aeronautics.

The crisis reached its peak in the "Tramandaí incident", in December 1964, when an S-55 had its rotor machine-gunned on the ground by FAB soldiers to prevent its take-off. Two ministers of the Air Force ended up asking for resignation, but the government of president Castelo Branco reached a final agreement, dividing the aviation boarded by categories (fixed and rotary wings). FAB and MB exchanged aircraft and the 1st GAE began operating in Minas Gerais in 1965, but the agreement did not fully satisfy either party. The Minister of the Navy also asked for his resignation upon learning of the result. The Army also recreated its organic aviation in 1986, only with helicopters, without fanfare from the FAB. After the end of the useful life of the 1st GAE aircraft, the MB overcame resistance from the FAB and regained the right to use fixed-wing aircraft in 1998, forming the 1st Squadron of Interception and Attack Airplanes with A-4 Skyhawk jets.

== Background ==
=== External ===
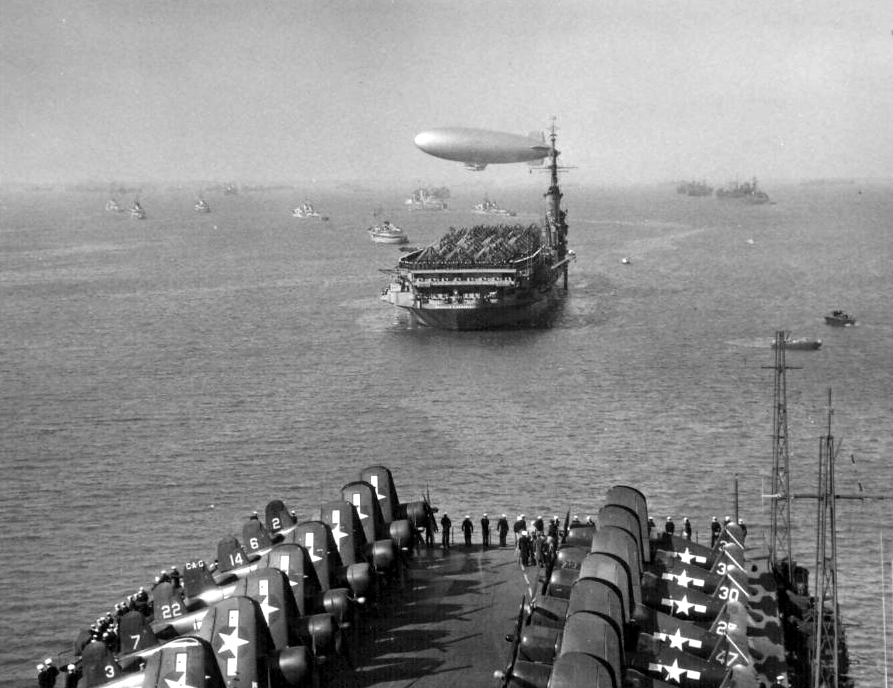
Embarked aviation on American aircraft carriers in 1946

After World War II (1939–1945), military naval aviation enjoyed great prestige. Naval aviation acts for the benefit of a naval force or in subsidiary activities of a navy. It can exist as land-based aircraft but operating at sea; rotary wing aircraft operating from ships such as cruisers; or fixed or rotary wing aircraft operating specifically from aircraft carriers. In World War II, aircraft carriers replaced battleships as the backbone of large naval forces. In the Battle of the Atlantic, both carrier and land-based aviation were decisive instruments in anti-submarine warfare. Although naval aviation can be defined as organic (maintained, piloted and commanded) of navies, aircraft carriers created the belonging problem of embarked aviation between navies and air forces.

After the war, military forces such as the British, American and Canadian had both maritime air services, belonging to the air forces, and naval air services, operating mainly from aircraft carriers. In the United Kingdom, the first country to form an independent air force, the Royal Air Force, in 1918, all military aviation was brought under the new Ministry of Air. Italy followed suit in 1929. Germany defined that naval air units would belong to the Air Force in 1939, but controlled by the Commander-in-Chief of the Navy in times of war. Some historians attribute the lack of organic aviation in the British Royal Navy to the lesser development of British naval aviation in the interwar period compared to the United States, where there was still no independent air force. In 1937, the Royal Navy once again had organic on-board aviation. France and Argentina created independent air forces without eliminating organic aviation from their navies. The U.S. Air Force, created in 1947, accepted that the U.S. Navy operated its own airborne aviation, although it objected to land-based long-range naval aviation.

=== In Brazil ===
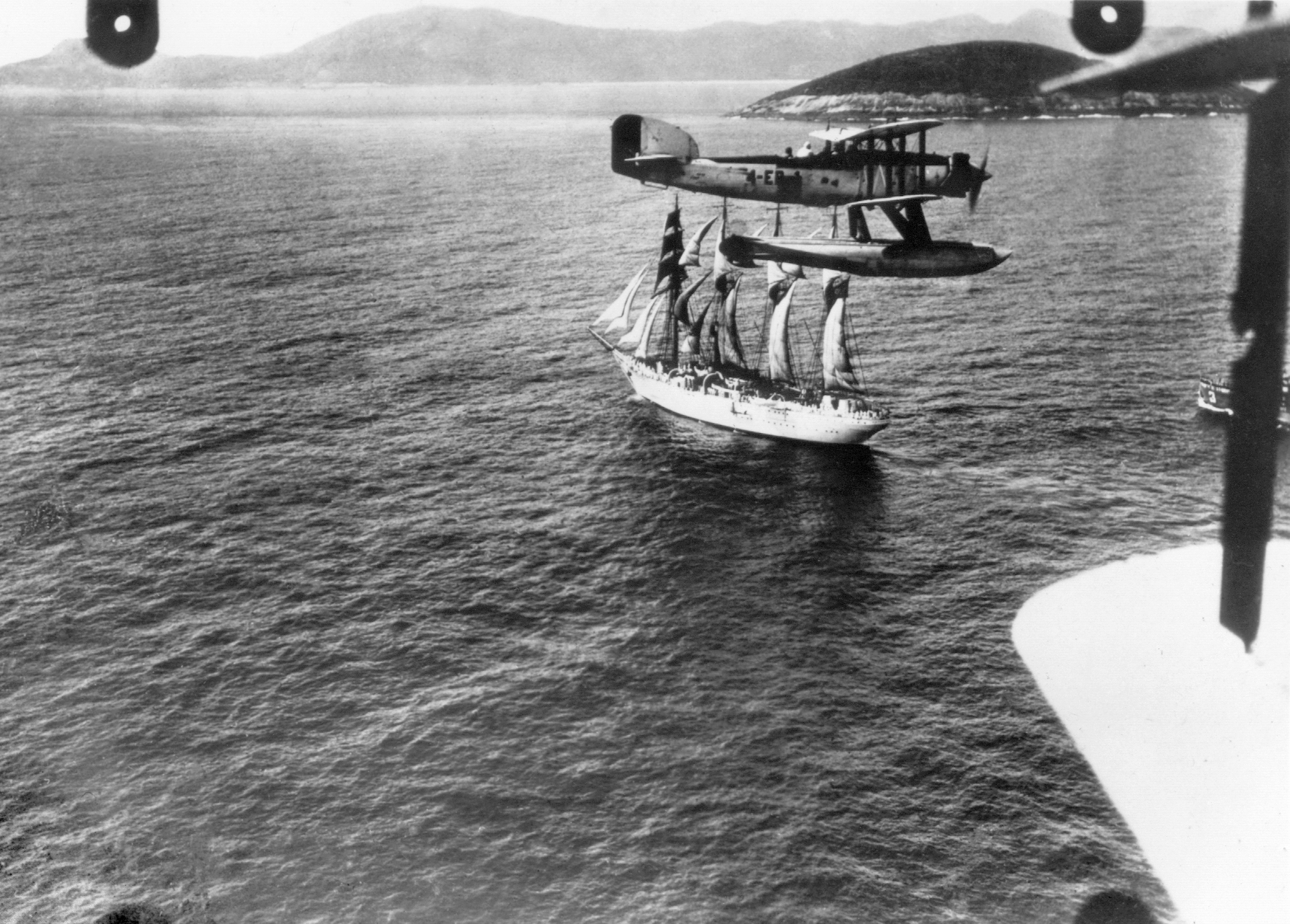
Fairey Gordon seaplane flying over the training ship Almirante Saldanha da Gama in 1934, in the first phase of Brazilian Naval Aviation

In Brazil, the Naval and Army aviation, whose training schools were respectively founded in 1916 and 1919, coexisted without any link for 22 years. Each was under the authority of a different ministry: that of the Navy and that of War. Civil aviation was the responsibility of the Ministry of Transport and Public Works. The Ministry of Aeronautics, created in 1941, became the highest authority for national aviation. The two military aviation units were united into the Brazilian Air Force, a Single Air Force. The Navy missed a great opportunity for air-naval expansion during Brazil's participation in World War II, after 1942, when FAB patrol aviation, from land bases, was used against German submarines in the Battle of the Atlantic.

The Ministry of the Navy was against this merger and did not appreciate the loss of its Naval Aviation to the FAB. According to admiral Renato de Almeida Guillobel:

When the Ministry of Aeronautics was created, the Navy shook in its foundations [...]. It delivered [...] to this new body a whole huge collection of materiel, buildings, workshops, housing, vast areas of land, immense estates which it could not have disposed of and which today it is sorely lacking, and more than all this, a large number of brilliant officers and subalterns, created by it and specialized in air and related matters.

The "large number of brilliant officers", however, had the opposite feeling. In 1958, another admiral, Fernando Almeida da Silva, retrospectively assessed this first generation of naval aviators:

Navy aviators began to form a separate group, whose components, in general, considered themselves much more like aviators than Navy officers, living far from the ships and even wearing different uniforms, which came to annul one of the main efficiency factors of their training - the sailor training, acquired and refined in the full exercise of naval tasks. Such an error must not be repeated.

From then on, a bilateral rivalry between the Navy and the Air Force was born. Thus, the embarked aviation problem arose long before Brazil purchased its first aircraft carrier.

== Conflicting thoughts ==
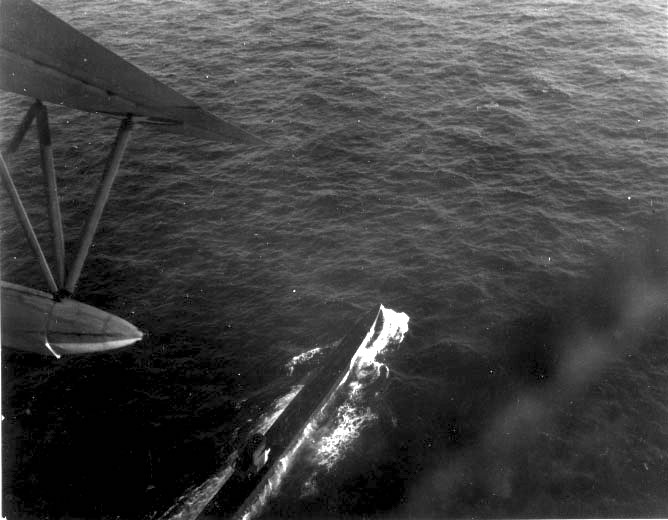
FAB PBY Catalina attacking German U-199 submarine in 1943

After World War II, the Navy did not give up on recovering its Naval Aviation, mainly due to the importance of aircraft for its focus in the period, anti-submarine warfare. In the context of Brazil's alignment with the Western bloc in the Cold War, the hypothetical threat would be the attack on Brazilian maritime trade by Communist bloc submarines, just as the trade routes had been attacked by the German Navy in World War II. The most powerful and longest-range anti-submarine mechanism would be a Hunt and Destroy Group, composed of an aircraft carrier and four to six destroyers. It would not necessarily need to be Brazilian. In the hemispheric defense arrangement between Brazil and the United States, the U.S. Navy would have extensive operations in the Atlantic, and the MB would be responsible for coastal defense of trade from the ports of Rio de Janeiro and Santos to the island of Trindade. Naval investments under admiral Guillobel (1951–1954) had auxiliary functions.

The cheapest option would be a land-based naval patrol aviation, but this would not be politically viable. The FAB could already perform this function, and maintained that the centralization of air activities in a single force saved resources; a separate naval aviation would duplicate an expensive infrastructure (air bases, training schools, parks and maintenance workshops), in addition to violating the legislation that granted the aviation monopoly to the Ministry of Aeronautics. The recreation of Naval Aviation was brought to the agenda of the General Staff in 1947, receiving opinions from the Brazilian Army, Navy and Air Force. The General Staff of the Air Force accepted maritime aviation on land or embarked, as long as it was under the command of the FAB. The General Staff of the Navy argued that organic aviation already existed in other navies and guaranteed better coordination and more specialized personnel, especially considering the peculiarities of naval aviation. The final opinion, the Secret 47-C letter, was to keep the air assets centralized in the FAB, which should cooperate with the MB. However, according to vice-admiral Fernando Almeida da Silva, the cooperation provided by the FAB was "insufficient, precarious and difficult to obtain".

The FAB was content with the status quo of the cooperation doctrine decided in 1947, while the MB wanted a revision. In addition to the barracks, the debate also appeared in major newspapers. The General Staff of the Armed Forces (EMFA), the successor body of the General Staff, was the stage for rivalries between the Army, Navy and Air Force. The creation of a naval aviation became a real possibility, but it was not known which corporation it would belong to. The FAB feared competition for resources with future Navy aircraft. Thus, a "technological, operational and doctrinal race" emerged. Both wanted maximum independence and freedom of action, the MB in control of the aircraft, and the FAB in command of maneuvers on deck, and therefore they exchanged accusations in the press and sought materiel conquests and government decisions. The continuous dispute showed that the EMFA did not bring the expected cohesion to the three Armed Forces corporations, and the Command and General Staff Schools maintained their autonomy. Even so, in the following decade the two branches were already careful to separate the doctrinal controversy from the operational issues in the air-naval instructions, in which their officers developed a good rapport.

== MB and FAB maneuvers ==
=== First measures ===
In 1946, the Navy's Board of Hydrography acquired a twin-engine Beechcraft D18S, but it was registered as a FAB plane, which was responsible for its maintenance. The plane was lost in an accident in 1952.

The FAB already took some preventive measures in advance, the biggest of which was the sending of 35 pilots to learn operations aboard aircraft carriers in the U.S. Navy in 1948–1949. The political-military debate became more intense, with an offensive content, after the creation of the Navy's Aeronautics Directorate (DAerM) in 1952, achieved after negotiations with president Getúlio Vargas and Minister of Aeronautics Nero Moura. This moment is presented by some as the resurgence of Naval Aviation, but "it would still be many years before a Navy pilot, piloting an aircraft of that institution, took off from one of its ships or naval air base". The counterpart of the FAB, created in the same year, was the Nucleus of Tactical Aero Command (NUCATAER), whose function was "to plan and coordinate joint operations with the Army and the Navy".

In 1954, the MB created the Aeronaval Observer (OAN) specialty, for liaison officers who would serve on board FAB aircraft, and in the following year, the Aeronaval Instruction and Training Center (CIAAN), to start training personnel of the area in Brazil, and obtained in the Military Assistance Program with the United States authorization to train six officers as helicopter pilots in the U.S. Navy. Naval air observers were enrolled in the primary piloting course at Aeroclube do Brasil; the purpose of training naval aviators was clear. To complete the CIAAN course, the Navy leased an airstrip and two Fairchild PT-19 planes from Aeroclube do Brasil, and therefore civilian aircraft, escaping the hegemony of the FAB.

An alternative to a naval aviation would be the Barroso-class cruisers, which had radar for air control and a hangar for helicopters for observation of fire, reconnaissance and rescue at sea. Two of them were bought by Brazil in 1951 and 1952 and named Barroso and Tamandaré respectively. However, this route was unsuccessful. Trials with FAB helicopters in 1954 were unsuccessful and the FAB did not respond to ministerial notices from the Navy regarding the purchase of its own helicopters.

=== Purchase of Minas Gerais ===
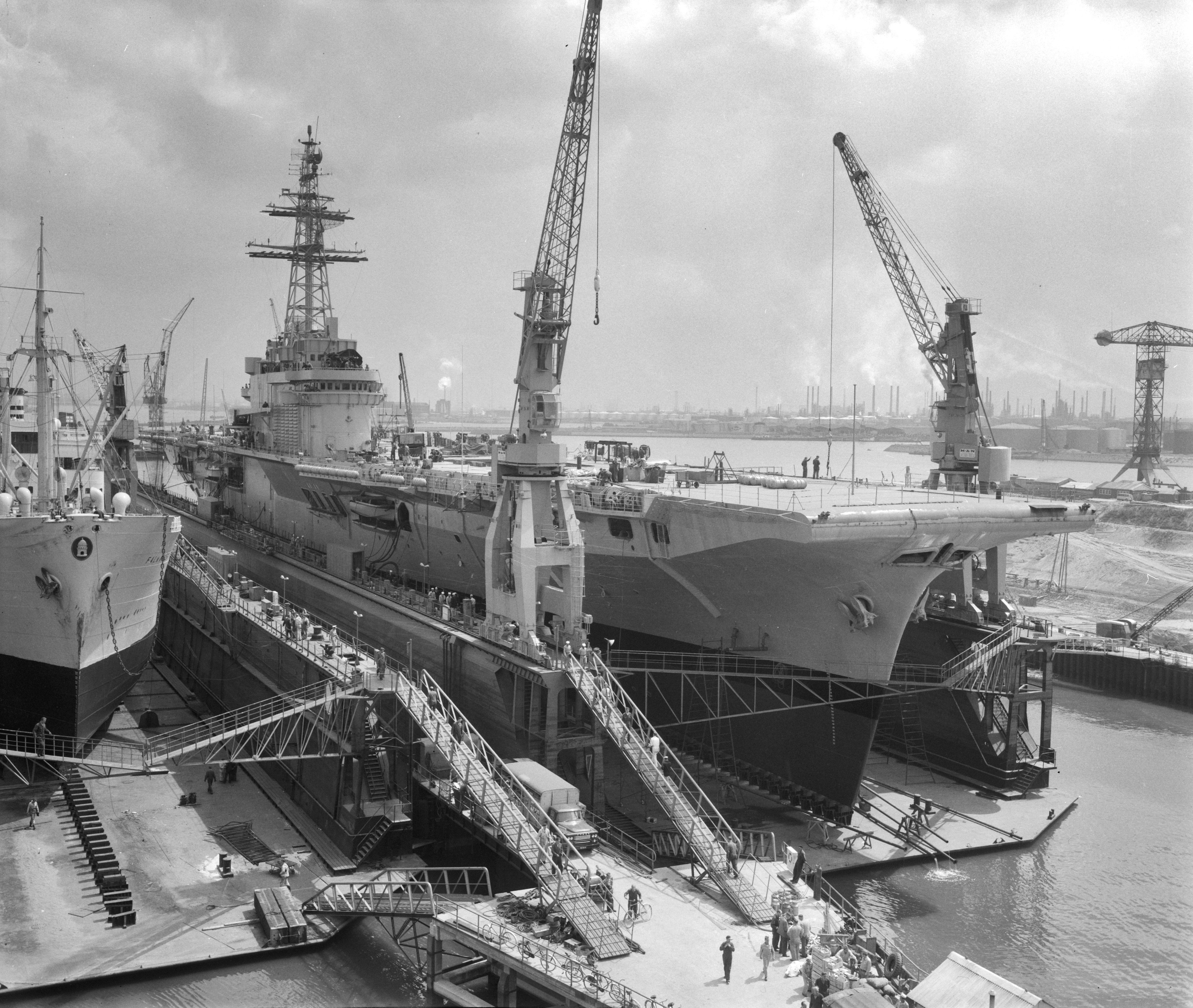
NAeL Minas Gerais docked in the Netherlands in 1960, before delivery to Brazil

The justification found by the Navy for Naval Aviation would be an aircraft carrier, whose raison d'être is embarked aviation, which would fulfill different functions from those already performed by the FAB on land. Controversially, on 13 December 1956, the Navy announced the purchase of the British aircraft carrier HMS Vengeance, designated Navio-Aeródromo Ligeiro (NAeL) Minas Gerais. MB officials had a consensus in favor of the aircraft carrier, but not the FAB. In a later statement, brigadier Nero Moura criticized president Juscelino Kubitschek for authorizing the ship "to the detriment of the guidance of the General Staff of the Armed Forces and contrary to the planned organization for the Armed Forces”.

At this time, the Navy's trump card was the capitalization of the Naval Fund, through which it depended only on the president's authorization to purchase HMS Vengeance. Otherwise, funding would be in the budget and would undergo approval by the National Congress and the EMFA, where it could be obstructed by party-political strife and corporate lobbying. The president authorized the purchase to appease the opposition he faced in the FAB and MB. (Note: See 11 November movement, Aragarças Revolt, and Revolta de Jacareacanga.) In the Navy's view, there was an "Aircraft Carrier Enemies Club", composed of activists and supporters of the Communist Party, aeronauts and airline unionists, journalists and the military. The most notorious would be deputy Paulo Mincarone and journalist David Nasser. Mincarone even published the book Escândalo do Minas Gerais in 1959, accusing the Navy of "spurious" expenses, exceeding the value of the ship, and lack of transparency.

Relations between Brazil and Argentina were at a sensitive point, and the Argentine Navy acquired its own aircraft carrier, ARA Independencia, in the same period. However, regional rivalry was not a preponderant factor, as the ship's main function would be anti-submarine, and the policy of the United States, which supported this capability, was to maintain the naval balance between Argentina, Brazil and Chile. In the parity scheme, the Brazilians, Argentines and British negotiated the sending of two aircraft carriers of the same class to Brazil and Argentina. The FAB feared American support for the MB in the matter, as the American Navy had helicopters and organic planes, but the Americans did not care which branch would operate the anti-submarine means.

The FAB maintains the statement that the purchase came as a surprise, but the subject was already discussed in the press, and the FAB itself pressured the president to acquire the ship when it felt that the purchase was irreversible. What happened was a lack of communication from the Navy to the Air Force after the purchase. Interservice relations deteriorated considerably. In March 1960, when the ship was still undergoing modernization in the Netherlands, a delegation from the FAB presented itself to the Aircraft Ship Purchase Inspection Commission to visit the works, but was not allowed to board. Minas Gerais arrived in Brazil in February 1961, after the end of Juscelino Kubitschek's term.

=== Aircraft purchase ===
==== By FAB ====
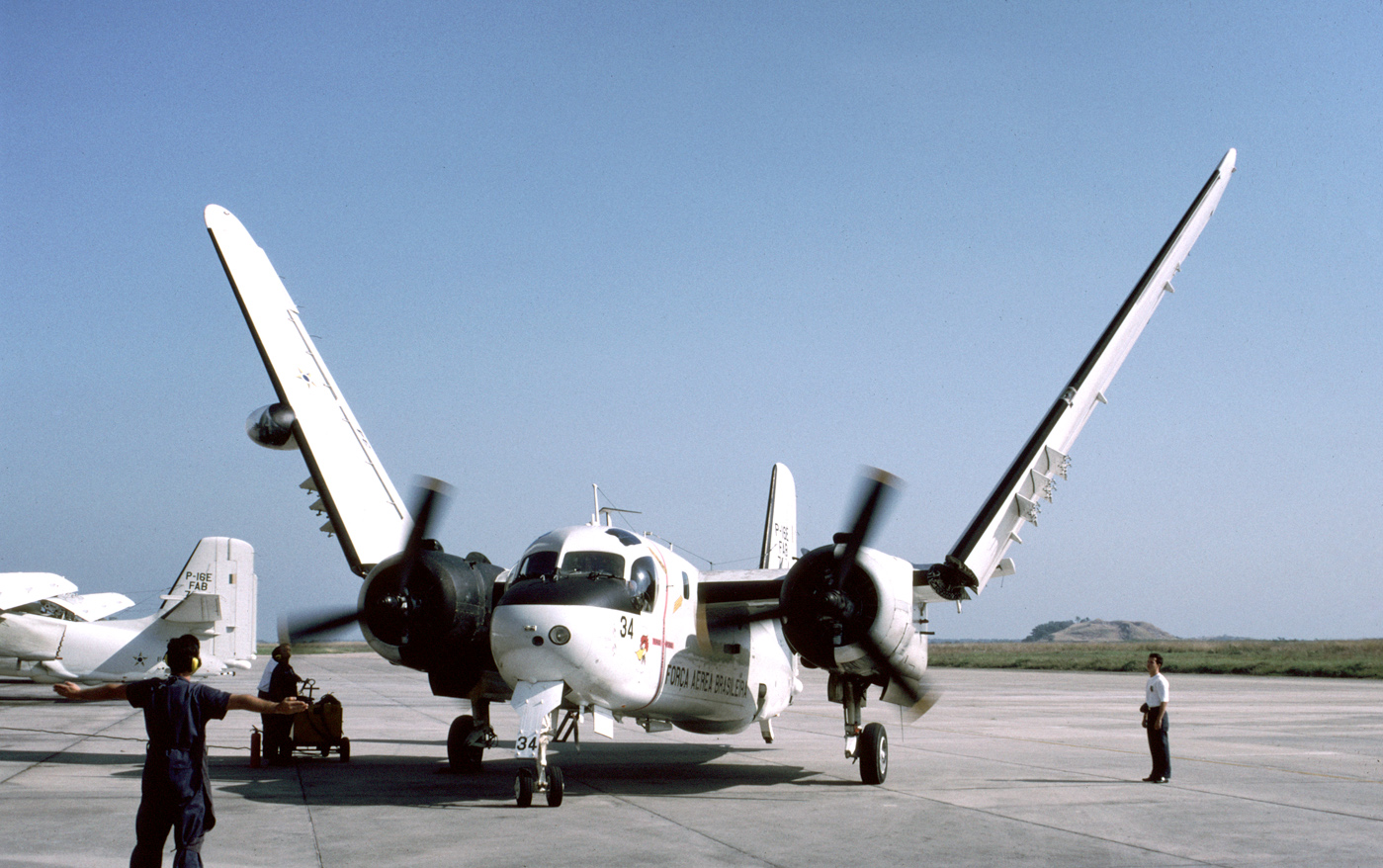
FAB's S-2E Tracker

At the time of the purchase of Minas Gerais, the Brazilian Navy had no aircraft. After the aircraft carrier was a fait accompli, FAB and MB both believed that the future pilots would be theirs. The MB accelerated its preparation of pilots and maneuvers to acquire aircraft, while the FAB created the 1st Group of Embarked Aviation (GAE) in February 1957 to prevent the emergence of an organic aviation of the Navy. The creation decree, signed by the president, evidenced the State's intention to maintain the current organization of the Armed Forces, with the monopoly of aviation in the FAB. In the same year, the FAB also activated the 2nd Liaison and Observation Squadron (ELO), with North American T-6 planes and H-13 helicopters.

Inauguration of the 2nd ELO

As the purchase and modernization of Minas Gerais were confidential and the MB did not inform that its mission would be anti-submarine warfare until the beginning of 1957, the FAB had planned the 1st GAE with a squadron of Anti-submarine Patrols and another of Fighter Planes, not ruling out the possibility of using the fighters against Argentina. When the mission became clear, on 22 January 1957, the FAB obtained, as part of the Fernando de Noronha Agreement, signed by the Brazilian government with the United States, modern embarked aircraft: 13 Grumman S2F-1 Tracker planes (P-16 in FAB) and six H-SS1N (SH-34J) helicopters. The agreement authorized an American satellite tracking station in Fernando de Noronha. Training for equipping and maintaining the new aircraft took place with the U.S. Navy, and they were received in January 1961. Even so, the 1st GAE was not authorized to land in Minas Gerais.

==== By MB ====
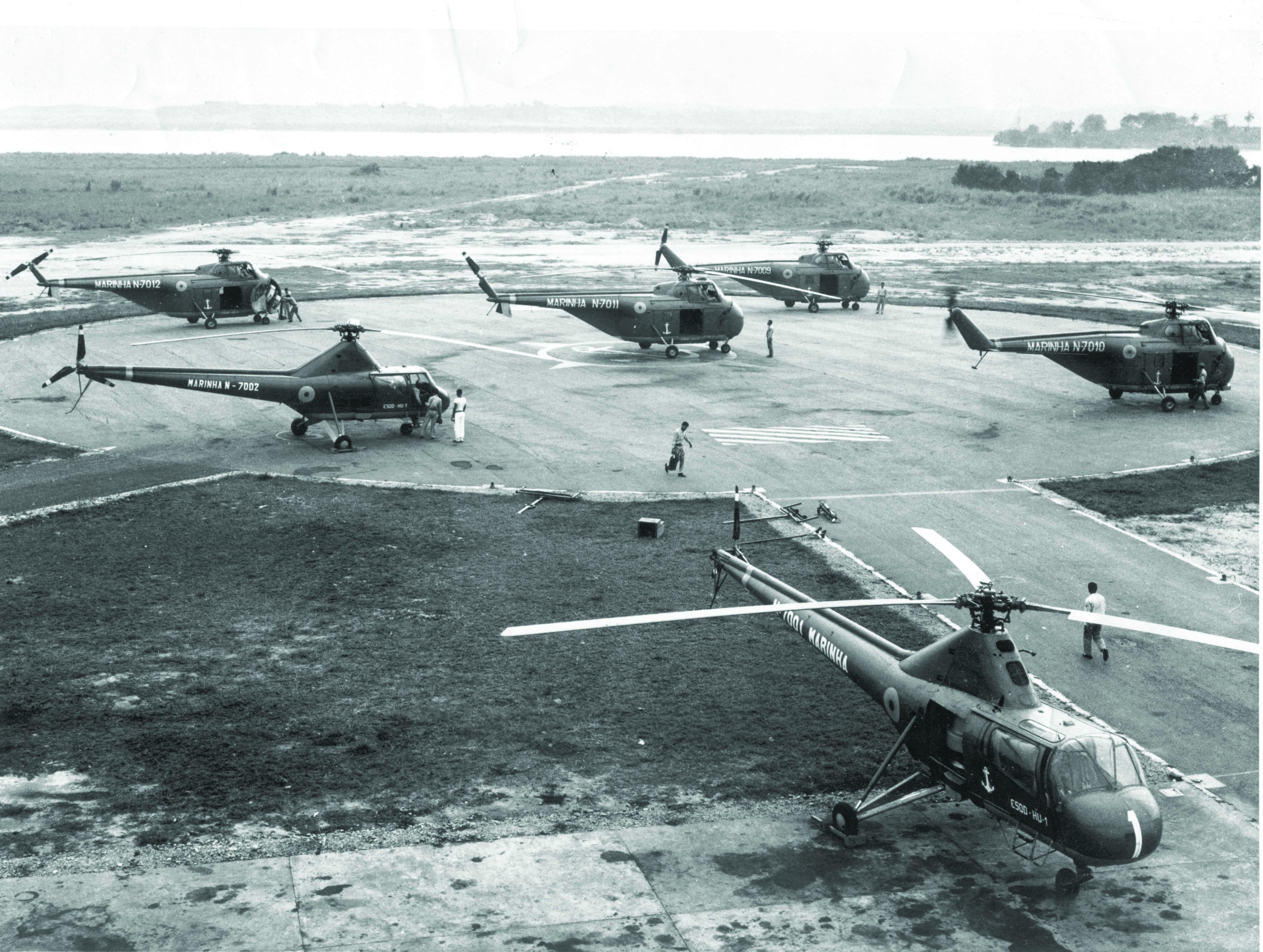
Helipad with Westland Widgeon and Whirlwind helicopters

As the corporations of the Armed Forces had a high degree of autonomy, the Navy was able to act autonomously. It acquired aircraft covertly, taking advantage of the Naval Fund. Personnel instruction continued in parallel to the purchases. The FAB monitored all the Navy's aeronautical acquisitions and threatened the suppliers that served the MB with retaliation. As the aircraft were not recognized by the FAB, air traffic control reported a risk to flight safety in Rio de Janeiro whenever they flew, calling them "unidentified objects".

The Navy began receiving its helicopters orders in 1958, when it already had a small cadre of pilots and qualified support personnel. At first, three Bell HUL-1 (mod. 47J), two Westland Widgeon (HUW) and two Bell-Kawasaki HTL-6 (mod. 47G, used for the hydrographic vessels Sirius and Canopus) arrived. The purchase of Widgeon led to the sending of two officers, already trained as naval air observers, to complete the course at the factory in England, and that of Bell-Kawasaki, of two officers to Japan and two others, in addition to a maintenance team, for the UK. The regular class of Naval Air Observers at CIAAN had 13 students in 1958. The Bell 47Js came packed and were assembled at the CIAAN. The Widgeon and 47J had terrible operating conditions; for officers, they were mere teaching aids.

In 1960, 20 officers went on to the Naval Aviation course in the United States and another six to the helicopter pilot course at Bell and U.S. Navy facilities. In the following year, Minas Gerais brought on board six Bell HTL-5 helicopters (47D mod.), three Westland Whirlwind and three Grumman TBF Avenger aircraft. TBF Avengers were second hand planes, donated by the U.S. government, and used only for deck training. In addition to the small and obsolete fleet of helicopters, the Navy sought to purchase operational fixed-wing aircraft, despite opposition from the federal government and the FAB. In 1962, the DAerM negotiated the acquisitions in complete secrecy.

One episode that can be cited in how this process was carried out was the purchase of six first-hand Pilatus P.3s for training purposes and six second-hand North American T-28 Trojans, converted for air operations. Although technologically inferior to the FAB's P-16 Tracker, its low price was what was within reach of the restricted MB budget. Circumventing the rules, the acquisitions were made without prior authorization from the government and without notifying the Armed Forces. The T-28s, which were slightly different from the U.S. military version, were registered with the Air Ministry as civilian aircraft. These two batches of planes arrived in Brazil completely disassembled and packed into MB troop transport ships. One of these batches of parts was on board NTrT Soares Dutra, which docked at the docks of the Rio de Janeiro Navy Arsenal. The T-28 parts were transferred to Minas Gerais at night, where the aircraft were assembled under the supervision of an American technician and took off on 17 October 1963.

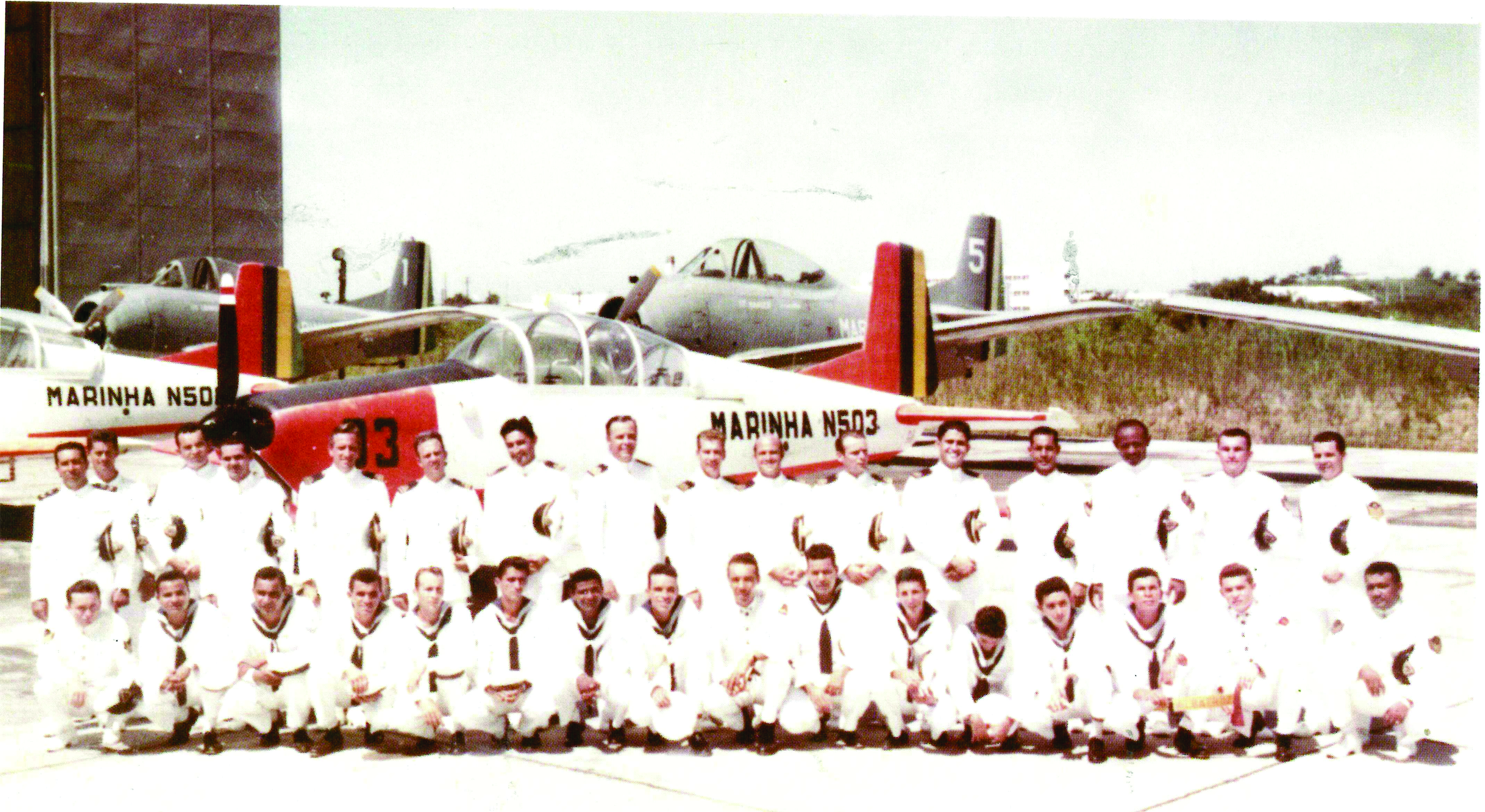
Fixed-wing naval aviators in 1965

The assembling process of the Pilatus P.3 was more difficult. While the T-28s were sent to Minas Gerais, the Pilatus were sent to the hangar of the First General Employment Helicopter Squadron (HU-1). However, this base was not equipped with a runway. The solution found was the construction of a 600-meter-long compacted soil runway at the back of the HU-1 facilities. It was completed in three months with the assistance of the 8th District of the National Roads Department (DNER). The Brazilian Marine Corps provided the necessary equipment and workers were hired from the immediate vicinity of the building. However, it ran parallel to the main runway at Galeão Airport, two kilometers away, where some FAB units operated. In order to avoid detection by the FAB, the takeoff of the aircraft was scheduled for the early hours of the morning. They took off as planned, but one Pilatus had to fly over the Merchant Marine School building, as a FAB C-47 was about to take off. Due to these aircraft not being equipped with an advanced radio system, five HU-1 helicopters were positioned along the route (Saquarema-Araruama-Naval Base) to inform the movements of the Pilatus. The process was successful, with the sixth aircraft needing to be taken overland for technical reasons.

Despite the silence in the purchase, transport and assembly, the FAB and the press made several criminal accusations, with or without foundation, from 1962 onwards. The tone was one of scandal. The newspaper O Jornal used the term "contraband" for the planes' disembarking. Correio da Manhã called the planes "clandestinely shipped" illegal and condemned the danger of air collision caused by the runway at Galeão. The controversial location of this runway led the Union of Airways to request an end to "absolutely irregular" flights. The FAB, through the Department of Civil Aviation, could guarantee flight safety if it cooperated with the MB, which none of the branches could do. After the arrival of the Pilatus P.3, the FAB made reconnaissance flights over the terrain of the HU-1. The Navy sought to defend itself in the debate without verbally attacking the FAB. Public opinion leaned towards the FAB due to the secrecy of MB's negotiations with the United States and their possible illegal nature. Formally, the EMFA had not declared that the FAB had a monopoly on military aviation.

In 1962, the "Wings for the Navy" campaign obtained a Taylorcraft BC-12D, a Fairchild PT-26 and a Neiva P-56 Paulistinha as donations, but they were second hand planes. To escape the FAB's opposition, a model of instruction plane that would be produced in Brazil in large quantities was announced: the Niess 7-250 Fragata, designed by engineer and also aviation instructor Marc William Niess. It was a single-engine, metal-built aircraft designed for advanced and armed training operations. A prototype was near completion in 1965.

=== Provocations ===
MB and FAB aircraft met in the air several times. In one of the first encounters, in early 1961, a T-6 of the 2nd ELO aggressively maneuvered around a CIAAN Westland Widgeon. According to the FAB pilot, the Galeão tower flight controller had requested the removal of an unidentified helicopter from the area. The inauguration of president Jânio Quadros, that year, brought rumors that he might close the CIAAN and transfer the helicopters to the FAB. This spurred the organization of the Naval Air Force and the first MB air units. On 23 August 1961, the president requested a demonstration of landing the P-16 on deck, which could bring victory to the FAB. But two days later, Jânio Quadros resigned and the FAB personnel were removed from the ship before it could land. In the subsequent political crisis, Minas Gerais was sent to the coast of Santa Catarina to face the Legality Campaign, which the Third Army, from southern Brazil, had joined. The aircraft carrier sailed without its aviation on board.

The commander of the Naval Air Tactical Command landed in an SH-34J helicopter on the deck of the aircraft carrier on 7 September 1962 to deliver a message of cordiality, but the conflict between the branches continued. The 1st GAE carried out several independent missions, participating in the "Lobster War" in 1963. The absence of Minas Gerais in the air and naval operations of the Lobster War was used by FAB defenders to attack the MB in the public debate, even though they occurred close to the coast, where land air bases were sufficient, and did not involve submarines.

Ideological divergences among the military regarding the government of João Goulart (1961–1964) were not the cause of the problem with embarked aviation, but they interfered in its dynamics. Goulart left the issue open to prevent the Navy and Air Force from uniting against him. On 12 June 1963, the newspaper Tribuna da Imprensa reported that a T-6 plane from the 2nd ELO was almost machine-gunned by the Navy when flying over the naval air base in São Pedro da Aldeia. In response to this and other incidents, the president suspended Navy flights for 60 days. After three months, the order had still not been revoked and was still in effect under the administration of Navy Minister Sílvio Mota. When the minister visited São Pedro da Aldeia in September, he was welcomed by a mass of young lieutenant captains. The indiscipline movement, known as the "Revoada", was supported by officials opposed to the president and did not result in punishments. The interdiction was revoked, but Minas Gerais participated in the UNITAS IV international exercise, in the same month, without embarked aircraft. Even so, Argentine planes, piloted by Brazilian officers, landed on the deck, which was received as an affront by FAB officers.

=== Tramandaí incident ===
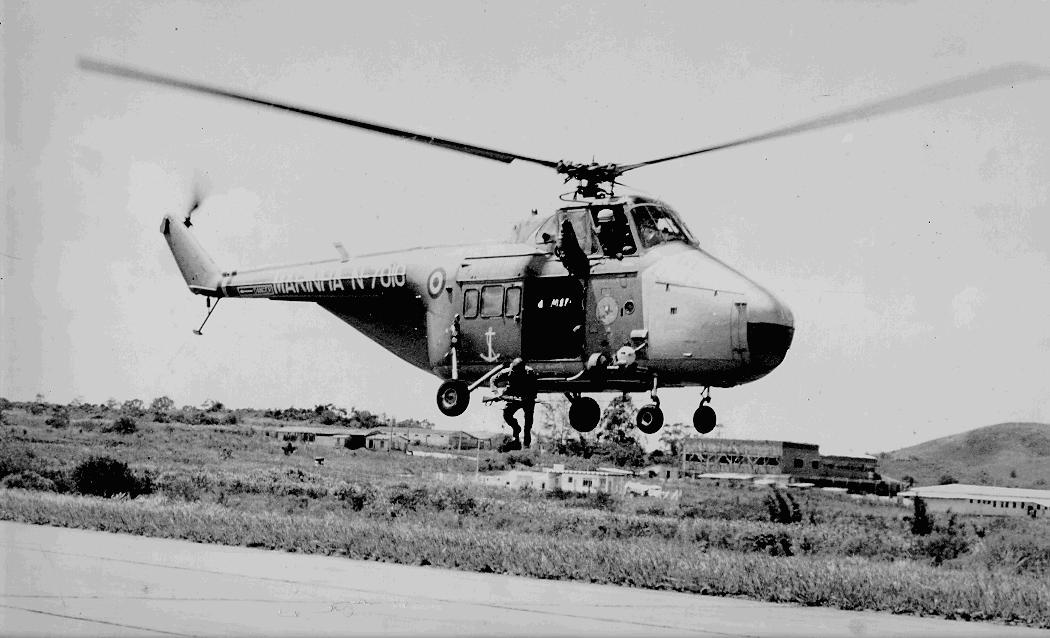
Naval Aviation's S-55, the same model as the helicopter strafed on land in the incident

In early December 1964, two HU-1 helicopters were operating in Rio Grande do Sul: a Widgeon N-7001 assisted NHi Argus in a hydrographic survey at Lagoa dos Patos and an S-55 N-7009 (Westland Whirlwind) provided support for Operation Pintassilgo through patrols along Brazil's border with Uruguay and in the cities of Jacaré and Rio Grande, due to suspicions of arms smuggling in the region, with possible cover-up by Leonel Brizola. On 4 December, both helicopters were called to assist the Rio-Santos boat race during Navy Week. Due to the distance between the helicopters, they would start the trip independently, meeting in Santos for the overnight stay. At that time, the scales for this trip were in Tramandaí, Florianópolis, Paranaguá and Santos. The first stopover, Tramandaí, consisted of an old Cruzeiro do Sul radio station which, through an agreement with the Navy in 1963, became an important supply point.

At dawn on the 5th, the N-7009 landed at the site, which, to its surprise, was taken over by FAB forces. The commander of the aircraft, and also the commander of the HU-1, was approached by a FAB officer and informed of the seizure of his helicopter. However, after a conversation, the aircraft was released to continue its journey, heading to Florianópolis. This did not happen with the N-7001, which landed around 9:30 AM on the same day. The aircraft was also approached by three officers, who communicated a message similar to that of the N-7009. Refusing to comply with the order, the commander headed for his aircraft, starting the engine, however, FAB soldiers opened fire on the helicopter's tail rotor, preventing its takeoff.

As a result, a Military Police Inquiry was filed on 11 December. The tension between the two ministries reached such a point that it reached the Federal Government, leading the Air Force Minister, brigadier Nelson Lavanére-Wanderley, to resign from his post, being succeeded by brigadier major Márcio de Sousa Melo. After these events, NAeL Minas Gerais entered Guanabara Bay, displaying its T-28s on deck for the first time. Outraged by such an affront, the Air Force Minister complained to the Navy, which refused to remove the aircraft. In response, Sousa Melo resigned after less than a month in office, being succeeded by Eduardo Gomes. The need for a solution to the conflict was clear, and studies were started on the state of Brazilian Naval Aviation that would be concluded in a short time.

== Resolution ==
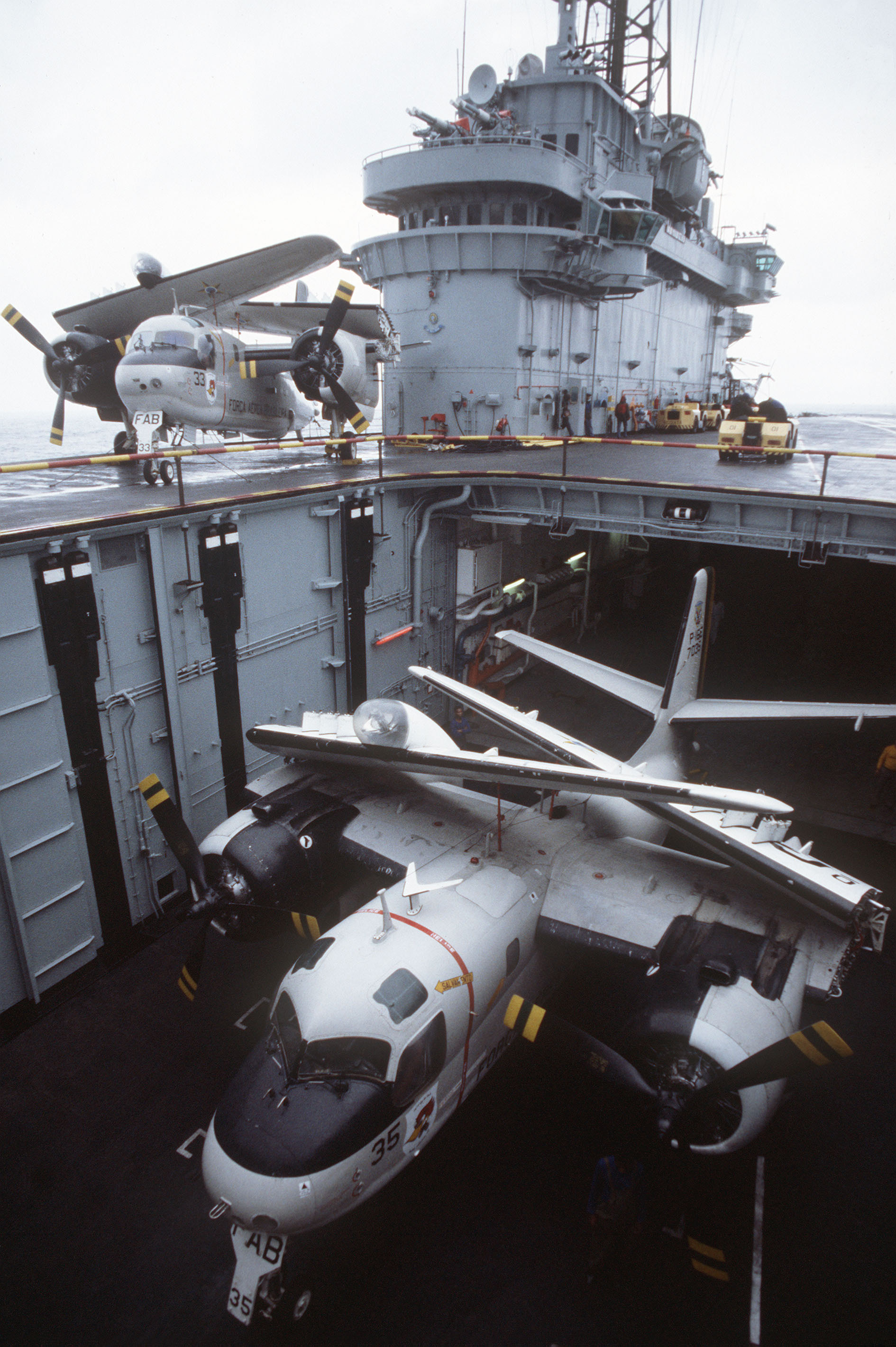
FAB P-16 planes embarked in Minas Gerais in 1984

Intermilitary discord, even more so at the beginning of the military dictatorship in Brazil, was not convenient for the Brazilian Army, the predominant branch within the EMFA. Nor did the United States want the crisis to continue, although it did not care about the outcome from a military point of view. While FAB and MB competed for Naval Aviation, the Army always wanted to preserve its superiority over both and keep the rivalry under control. At the time of the purchase of Minas Gerais, it did not make a direct statement, but preferred an aircraft shipped in the hands of the FAB to avoid a unilateral gain for the MB. The idea developed later was to share aviation categories (fixed and rotary wings) between the two branches. The technological inferiority of the MB planes to the FAB's P-16 favored the latter to remain with fixed wing aircraft. The mixed participation of the two branches in embarked aviation was brigadier Eduardo Gomes' suggestion to president Castelo Branco.

The government's solution was the "Castelo Branco corollary": Decree 55,627 of 23 January 1965, allowing the Navy to have an organic Naval Aviation with rotary-wing aircraft, but preserving the exclusivity of fixed wings for the FAB. Consequently, the two branches exchanged equipment. Naval Aviation would deliver 27 planes to the FAB, receiving six Sikorsky SH-34J helicopters in exchange. Minas Gerais was carrying out instructional operations in the Northeast, being called upon after the approval of the decree. On the 28th, the Ministers of the Navy and Air Force formalized the legislation on board the ship, followed by maneuvers by the T-28s. The first P-16 landed on the aircraft carrier on 22 June 1965. From then on, the aircraft carrier, Naval Aviation helicopters (on land and on board) and the 1st GAE operated in an integrated manner. When on board, the 1st GAE reported directly to the ship's commander. The 2nd ELO had its headquarters transferred to São Pedro da Aldeia.

If for the Air Force the result was only a partial victory, the Navy was even less satisfied. Its minister, admiral Ernesto de Melo Batista, asked for his resignation and no active-duty admiral accepted to take his place. President Castelo Branco only achieved peace by appointing reserve admiral Paulo Bosísio. The FAB–MB rivalry continued. The Navy abandoned plans for a second aircraft carrier. The Niess 7-250 Fragata project was cancelled. Of the planes delivered to the FAB, few were used, and for a short time.

== Later developments ==
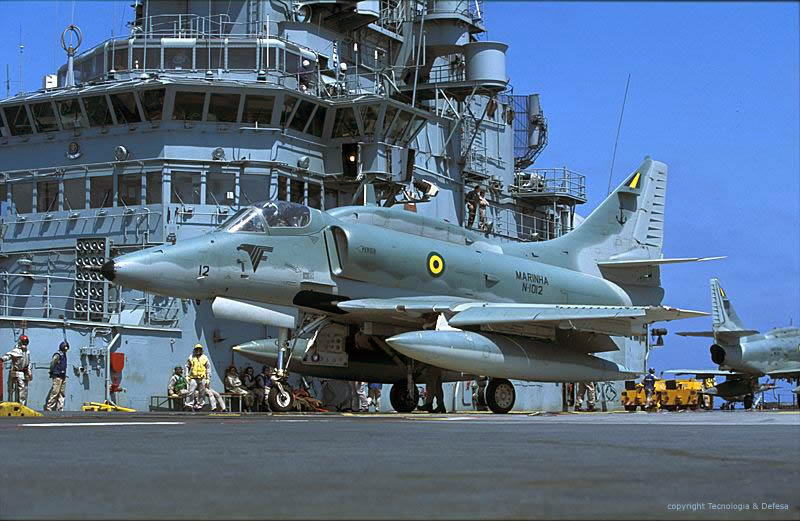
Return of fixed wing aircraft to Brazilian Naval Aviation: A4 Skyhawk jet on the deck of São Paulo

The Brazilian Army recreated its organic aviation, with helicopters only, in 1986, without fanfare or resistance from the FAB. The P-16s embarked on Minas Gerais reached the end of their useful life in December 1996. The aircraft carrier itself was also approaching the end of its useful life. The historical disagreements between FAB and MB were one of the reasons for the creation of the Ministry of Defense in 1999. After the end of the P-16, the Navy regained the right to operate fixed-wing aircraft by Decree 2,538 of 8 April 1998, overcoming new resistance from the FAB behind the scenes. It acquired A-4 Skyhawk fighters and the new aircraft carrier São Paulo. Although celebrated as a great achievement, both the fighters and the aircraft carrier were difficult to maintain. São Paulo was deactivated in 2017, and the fighters were tied to land bases, expected to be decommissioned in 2025–2027. The Army tried to acquire its own fixed-wing aircraft (Short C-23 Sherpa) in 2020, but resistance from the FAB managed to prevent the project. One of the brigadiers' arguments was precisely the fate of the Naval Aviation fighters.
