= Brazilian Navy General Staff =

Brazilian space command

- Estado-Maior da Armada
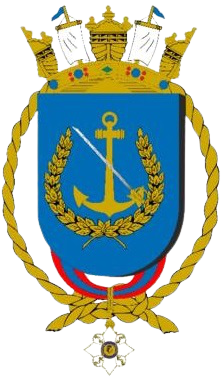
- Coat of arms of EMA
- Active: 1890; 136 years ago
- Country: Brazil
- Type: General management body
- Part of: Brazilian Navy
- Garrison/HQ: Brasília, DF
- Nickname: EMA

Commanders
- Current: Admiral Marcos Silva Rodrigues

The Brazilian Navy General Staff (Portuguese: Estado-Maior da Armada - EMA) is the general management body responsible for the coordination of the Brazilian Navy, the sea force of the Brazilian Armed Forces.

== Mission ==
The EMA's mission is to study, plan, guide, coordinate, and control at the general management level, the activities of the Navy, in accordance with the decisions and guidelines defined by the Navy Command.

== History ==
The EMA's history begin in the period of transition from the monarchic to the republican regime, through the Decree No. 430, of 29 May 1890. The Navy Ministry continued with the Armed Forces reorganizations, with the therm Navy General Staff officially created by the Decree No. 6,503 of 11 June 1907.

== See also ==
- Future of the Brazilian Navy
