= Aratu-class minesweeper =

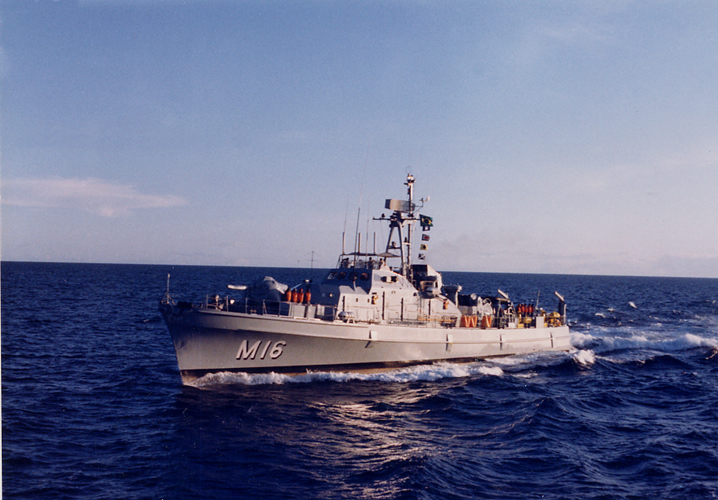
- M-16 Anhatomirim underway

Class overview
- Name: Aratu-class minesweeper
- Operators: Brazilian Navy

General characteristics
- Type: Minesweeper
- Displacement: 253 t (249 long tons) standard, 280 t (276 long tons) full load
- Length: 47.44 m (156 ft)
- Beam: 7.16 m (23 ft)
- Draught: 2.40 m (8 ft)
- Installed power: 4 Maybach diesel engines producing 4,500 BHP
- Propulsion: 2 shafts
- Speed: 24 mph (21 kn)
- Range: 700 nmi (1,296 km) @ 20 kn (23 mph)
- Complement: 32
- Armament: 1 x 40mm 70-caliber Bofors anti-aircraft gun

The Aratu class is class of coastal minesweepers of the Brazilian Navy.

== Design ==
Built in Germany in the 1970s by yacht-makers Abeking & Rasmussen, the wooden-hulled vessels are immune to magnetically-triggered mines. They conduct missions through magnetic, mechanical and acoustic means. Two shafts are powered by four Maybach diesel engines which produce 4,500 BHP, allowing the vessels to reach speeds of 24 knots. They are fitted with a single 40mm 70-caliber Bofors anti-aircraft gun.

== History ==
The Aratu class minesweeper was designed during the 1960s for Brazil, as part of a naval modernization programme enabling it to enhance its mine warfare capabilities. Abeking & Rasmussen were hired to construct six minesweepers based on the design of the German Schütze-class. The ships that were built at Lemwerder, West Germany were delivered to Brazil during the years 1971-1975.

To reduce susceptibility to magnetic influenced mines, the vessels hull was built of wood and other non magnetic materials. It main goal was to execute coastal mine countermeasure operations using equipment to conduct mechanical, magnetic and acoustic mine sweeping missions.

The lead ship, Aratu (M15), was commissioned in 1971, followed by the Anhatomirim (M16), Atalaia (M17), Araçatuba (M18), Abrolhos (M19), and Albardão (M20). The ship entered service with the Brazilian navy's Mine Countermeasures Force, replacing older WWII minesweepers substantially enhancing Brazil's naval capabilities.

Throughout their service, the ships took part in fleet exercises, naval training and mine countermeasure operations in Brazilian waters. They also participated in multinational exercises with regional and allied navies, contributing to Brazil's readiness in mine warfare. Beginning in the 1990s, the class gradually became obsolete as mine countermeasure technology shifted towards dedicated minehunters equipped with sonar and remotely operated vehicles. The vessels were progressively decommissioned during the 2000s and 2010s after more than three decades of service.

== Ships ==
- M15 NV Aratu (decommissioned on August 27th, 2026)
- M16 NV Anhatomirim (decommissioned on December 5, 2016)
- M17 NV Atalaia
- M18 NV Araçatuba
- M19 NV Abrolhos (decommissioned on August 20, 2015)
- M20 NV Albardão (decommissioned on May 21, 2021)

== Use ==
=== Mine Clearance ===
- These vessels were specifically designed for mine-clearing operations.
- Their wooden hulls made them immune to magnetically-triggered mines, which is a crucial advantage in mine-infested waters.
- Using various methods (magnetic, mechanical, and acoustic), they could detect and neutralize underwater mines, ensuring safe navigation for other ships.

=== Coastal Defence ===
- Aratu-class minesweepers played a vital role in coastal defence.
- Their ability to sweep and remove mines near shorelines protected harbours, ports, and coastal infrastructure.
- By keeping these areas clear of potential threats, they enhanced national security.

=== Versatility ===
- Despite their wooden construction, these vessels were surprisingly versatile.
- They could operate effectively in different environments, including shallow waters close to the coast.
- Their compact size allowed them to access areas larger ships couldn’t reach.

=== Brazilian Navy ===
- The Brazilian Navy deployed the Aratu-class minesweepers to safeguard its territorial waters.
- These ships contributed significantly to maintaining maritime security and ensuring safe passage for both military and civilian vessels.

== Modern Day ==
The Aratu-class minesweepers continue to serve in the Brazilian Navy. Currently, there are four active vessels in this class:

1. M15 NV Aratu
2. M17 NV Atalaia
3. M18 NV Araçatuba

Unfortunately, two of the Aratu-class minesweepers have been decommissioned:

- M16 NV Anhatomirim (decommissioned on December 5, 2016) 1.
- M19 NV Abrolhos (decommissioned on August 20, 2015) 2.

Additionally, M20 NV Albardão was also decommissioned on May 21, 2021 2. These wooden-hulled vessels, built in Germany during the 1970s by yacht-makers Abeking & Rasmussen, are uniquely designed to be immune to magnetically-triggered mines. They conduct their missions using magnetic, mechanical, and acoustic means 13. Their specialized capabilities make them valuable assets for coastal defence and mine-clearing operations.
