= Cruzeiro do Sul (newspaper) =

- Type: Daily newspaper
- Format: Broadsheet
- Owner(s): Fundação Ubaldino do Amaral
- Publisher: Hélio Sola Aro
- Editor: Sérgio Henrique Coelho
- Founded: 1903
- Headquarters: Sorocaba, SP, Brazil

Cruzeiro do Sul is the largest newspaper in Sorocaba city, São Paulo, Brazil. It was founded on June 12, 1903, by brothers Firmino Joaquim Pires de Camargo (Nho Quim Pires) and João Clímaco Pires de Camargo. The publication began distributing the same year, initially four pages, with a bi-weekly circulation. It is owned and sponsored by the Ubaldino do Amaral Foundation-FUA.

== History ==
In the beginning, the objectives of the newspaper were political, voicing strong opposition to the Republican Party PRP and their local leaders. On the night of October 30, 1903 there was an attempted arson and jamming of the paper. In 1936, the newspaper changed ownership and was purchased by Ignacio da Silva Rocha, Carlos Correia, who promoted improvements. In 1940, Orlando da Silva Freitas, director of Radio Clube de Sorocaba, bought the newspaper and start a through process to modernize the design and graphics.

In 1963, a group of 21 members of the Masonic Lodge Perseverance III acquired the Cruzeiro do Sul editor, beginning a process of modernization, and turning it into a non-profit. Since the time of foundation the paper has become a major media complex in São Paulo.

== Market Position ==
After almost a century, the "Cruzeiro do Sul" now occupies a unique position among Brazilian newspapers, whose market consists of 283 newspapers. In the 625 municipalities of São Paulo State, only 52 - just over 8% of the total - have a daily newspaper. Of these, most are not daily in the full sense of the word, circulating six days a week. The Cruzeiro do Sul circulates every day, from Monday to Sunday, and is audited by CVI (National Movement Tester). Its circulation is surpassed only by the Correio Popular on Sunday from Campinas.

Editorials

- Brazil
- Economy
- Sport
- Exterior
- Facts & Opinions
- Computers
- Mais Cruzeiro
- Police
- Policy
- Region
- Sorocaba

Channels

- Farming
- Sunday Notebook
- Home & Finishing
- Science & Technology
- Classifieds
- Cruzeirinho
- CruzeiroCard
- Education
- She
- Special
- Young People
- Motor
- More TV
- Presence
- Promotions
- Memory Project

Magazine

- Health
- Tourism

Columns

- Retired
- Article
- Channel Zaap
- Celso Ming
- Cinemas
- Cruise-Eye
- Consumer Protection
- Reader
- Dora Kramer
- Editorial
- Markets Today
- TV Movies
- End of Game
- Phrases
- Generate Kindness Kindness
- 100 years
- Horoscope
- Free Information
- Economic Indicators
- Lotteries
- Luís Nassif
- More Flavors
- Necrology
- Sports Opinion
- Panel
- Think Well
- Ask the INSS
- X-Ray
- Laughter Galera
- Screenplay TV
- Frog in water
- Segundão of Marvadão
- Time
- Touch of Light

== Surcursals ==
- Central Sorocaba
- Sorocaba Shopping Center
- Votorantim
- São Paulo
