= Brazilian Naval Aviation (1916–1941) =

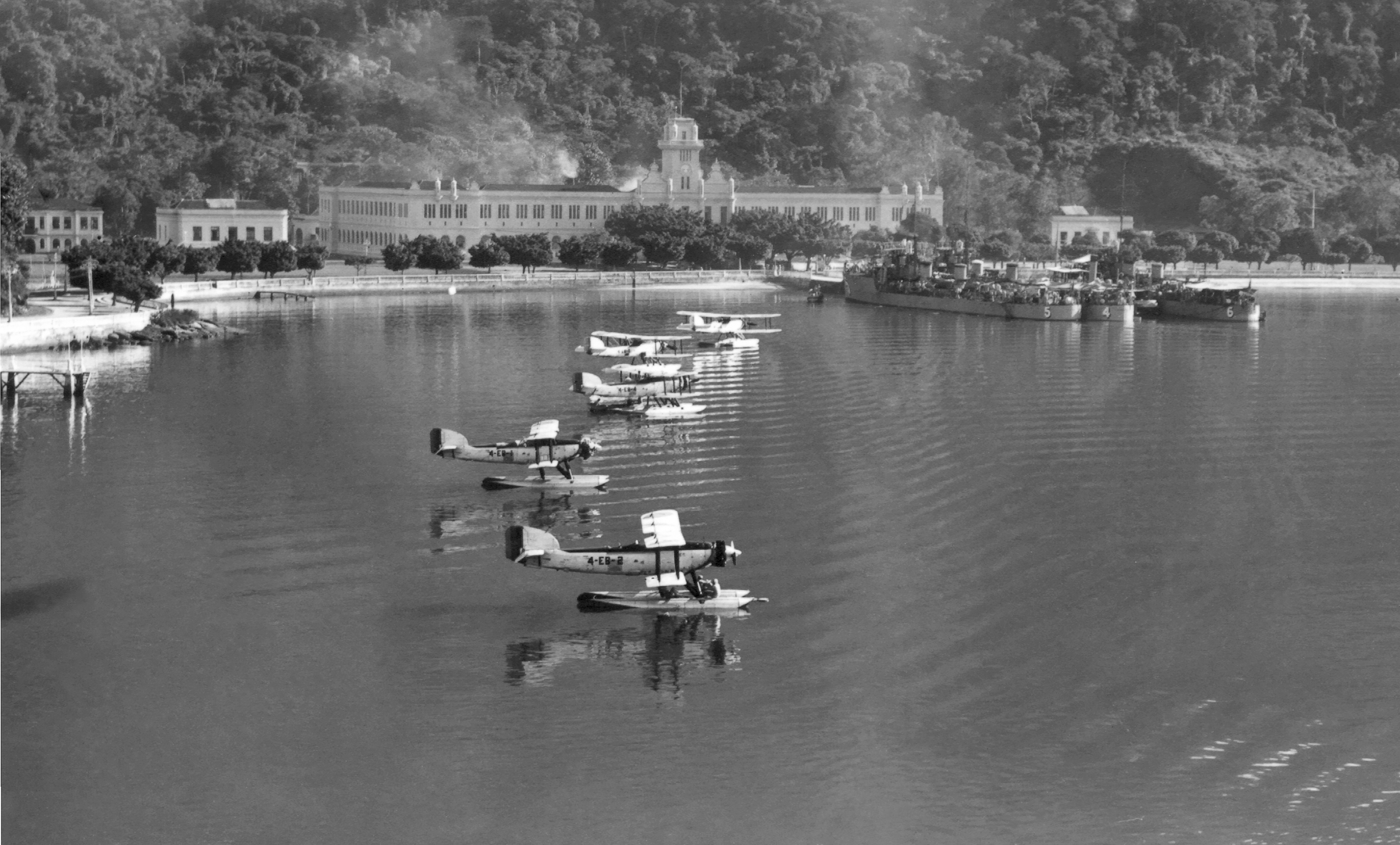
Fairey Gordon seaplanes in Angra dos Reis in the 1930s

The first historical phase of Brazilian Naval Aviation runs from its foundation in 1916 until its extinction and absorption by the newly-created Brazilian Air Force in 1941. It was the air service of the Brazilian Navy, managed by the Navy's Directorate of Aeronautics and tasked with the air defense of the Brazilian coastline using seaplanes and land planes. Its aviators were trained at the Naval Aviation School, in the federal capital, and served at air bases in Galeão and in the states. During this period, no embarked aviation was established, and the fleet did not operate aircraft carriers or ships with catapults.

Its birth was part of a military modernization policy through the importation of new technologies, in a country still devoid of an aviation industry. In the midst of the First World War, Brazil was able to train a nucleus of aviators in the air services of the Allied powers, and back in Brazil, it received advisory support from the United States Navy. The Brazilian Army would create its own air service in 1919, but the two air arms had no administrative connection.

The first operations were coastal raids, which allowed aviators to train outside Rio de Janeiro and brought publicity to aviation, as well as real operations against the tenentist revolts of the 1920s. The main representative of aviators within the naval high command, Captain Protógenes Guimarães, was himself arrested in 1924 for tenentist conspiratorial activity, resulting in government neglect toward Naval Aviation until the Revolution of 1930. The Vargas Era brought renewed investments, larger-scale operations in the 1932 Constitutionalist Revolution, access to new destinations with the Naval Air Mail, licensed assembly of Focke-Wulf aircraft in Galeão, and the consolidation of careers and personnel within the Aviation Corps.

Naval aviators gradually set themselves apart from the rest of the Navy's officer corps. They were a well-trained technical body, though known for cases of indiscipline and flight accidents, and were interested in the European model of independent air forces. In 1941, Getúlio Vargas unified the Army and Navy air services into a third branch, the Brazilian Air Force. 156 officers, 267 petty officers and enlisted men, and 99 aircraft of 15 types belonging to Naval Aviation were absorbed by the new service. This was done against the will of the Navy's leadership, which would rebuild an air service beginning in 1952, leading to what would become known as the "embarked aviation issue".

== Origins ==
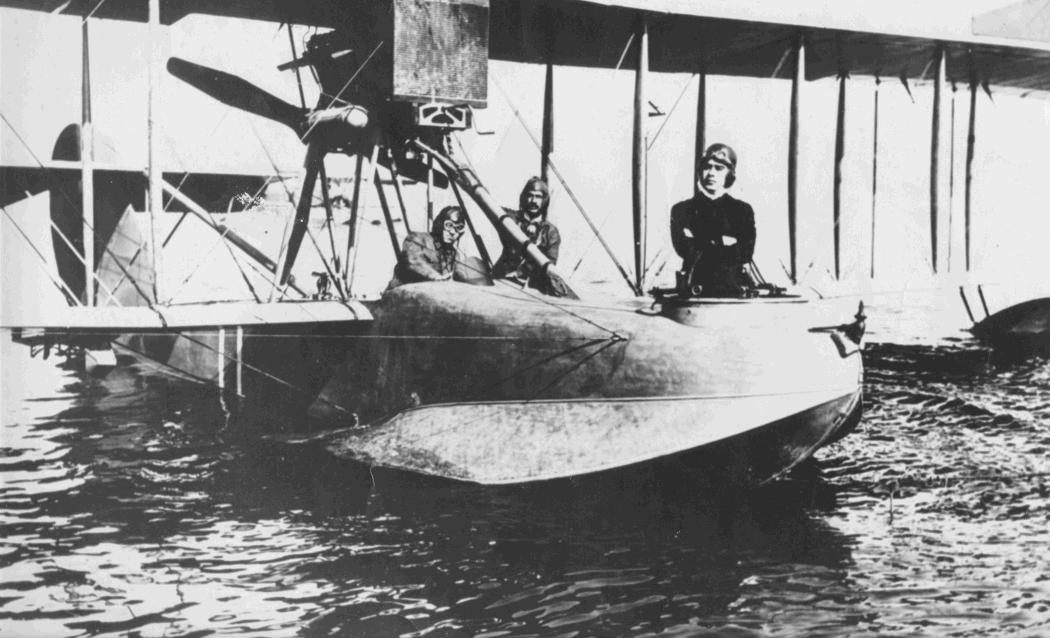
Curtiss F Model 1914, the Brazilian Navy's first class of aircraft

The naval possibilities of dirigibles and airplanes, and the organization of an air service in the Brazilian Navy, were discussed for the first time in the Brazilian press in 1908. The establishment of a naval aviation arm was planned in the 1906–1910 naval expansion program, during the South American naval arms race. In the Revista Marítima Brasileira, in 1910, Lieutenant Captain Oscar Pacheco observed that aviation and torpedoes weakened the preponderance of battleships in naval warfare. Aerial exploration—flying over fortifications, ports, and distant coasts at altitudes high enough to avoid being hit—would reduce the element of surprise. In 1914, in the same journal, Corvette Captain M. C. de Gouveia Coutinho compared the role of "hydro-aviation" to that of cruisers and cavalry.

Only five years after Santos Dumont's pioneering flight, Navy officers became the first president of the Brazilian Aeroclub (Admiral José Carlos de Carvalho) and the first Brazilian military officer to earn a brevet (First Lieutenant Jorge Henrique Moller), in 1911. Moller had been sent to France along with an Army lieutenant, Ricardo Kirk, months before the first military use of airplanes in world history, during the Italo-Turkish War. Aeronautics was a cutting-edge industry, newly born in the industrial powers. It did not exist in Brazil, where all the machinery for the consumer industry was imported and there was no flight school whatsoever, but the subject moved journalists and those interested in national defense.

It was difficult to acquire aeronautical equipment, and specialized instructors and mechanics were scarce. When the private sector, in partnership with the Ministry of War, founded the Brazilian School of Aviation in 1914, the Navy assigned 25 officers to attend, but the school ceased operations within five months, without brevetting a single aviator. Another school, founded by the Public Force of São Paulo, met the same fate. The Navy then chose to train its own pilots and technical personnel. After some attempts at partnerships with private enterprise, contact was made with the American aircraft manufacturer Curtiss Aeroplane Company and with the French Avions Farman. The second option was frustrated by the First World War, which absorbed all French aeronautical production.

=== Naval Aviation School ===
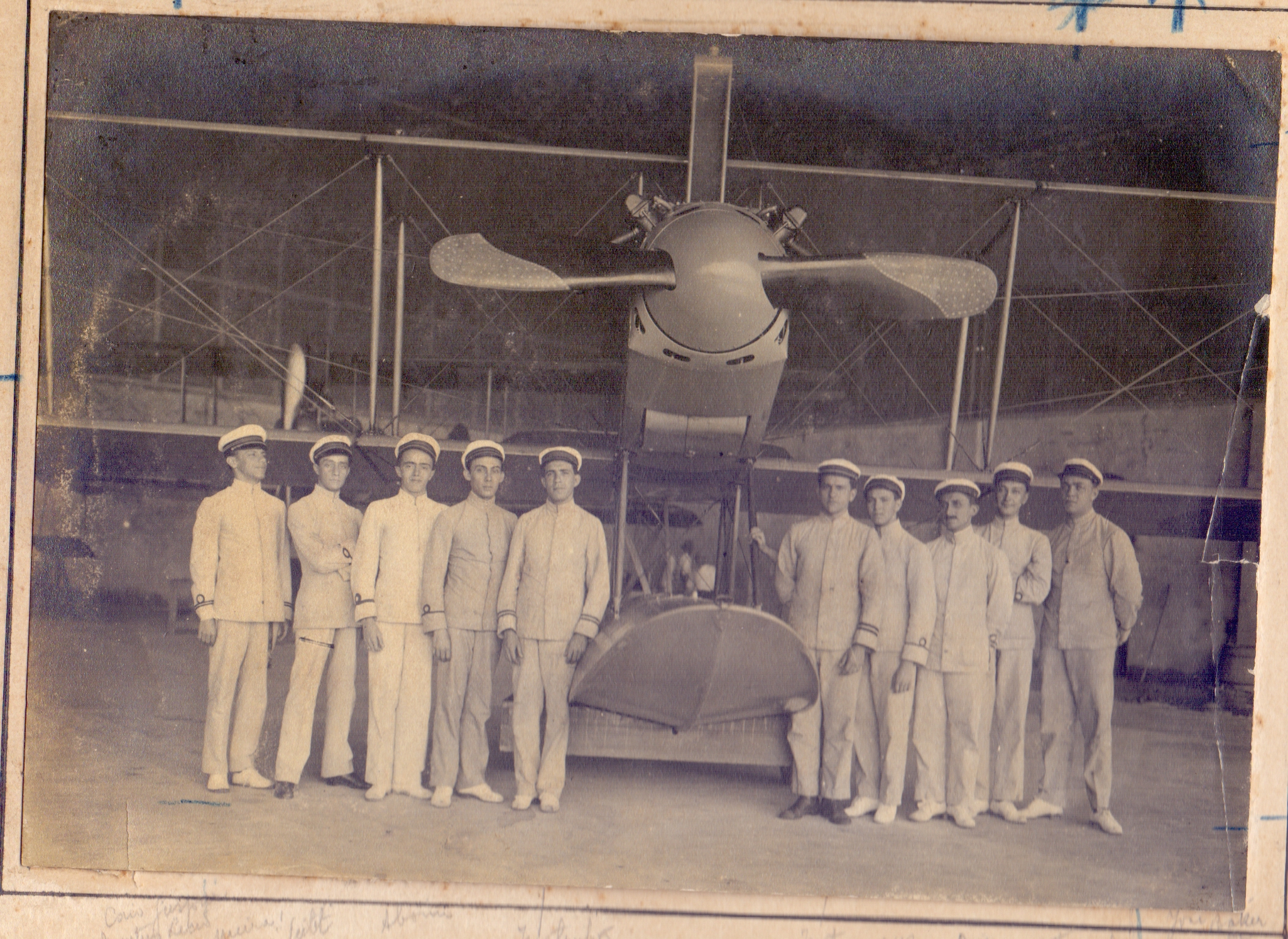
Americans and Brazilian aviator officers from the first class of the Naval War College

The School of Submersibles and Aviation, created by order of the Ministry of the Navy on 22 August 1914, never left the drawing board. Financial constraints and the effects of the war delayed the establishment of the school by two years, until it materialized through Decree No. 12,167, of 23 August 1916, which created the Naval Aviation School (EAvN) and the Submersible School. The date of 23 August 1916 marks the beginning of Brazilian Naval Aviation and demonstrates the Navy's pioneering spirit. The Army would only establish its Military Aviation in 1919. Unlike earlier attempts, this time there was a presidential decree (signed by Venceslau Brás), a national security vision, and the provision of regulations. The first director was Corvette Captain Protógenes Guimarães. Operations began at the old Navy Arsenal, in Mauá Square, and before the end of the year were transferred to Enxadas Island, a temporary headquarters while facilities were planned for Rijo Island.

The first aircraft arrived on 25 June 1914, and the first flight took place on 8 August 1914. They were three Curtiss F seaplanes, Model 1914, with registrations C1, C2, and C3, along with spare parts and a Curtiss pilot-mechanic, Orthon Hoover, hired to assist with training and assembly. Funding came from a popular fund originally intended to raise the necessary sum for the battleship Riachuelo. As the goal was not met, the resulting money was used to purchase these aircraft. Another version is that they were paid for with the Navy Ministry's budget for food supplies. The founding decree simply stated that it occurred "without increase of expenditure".

The first three Brazilian naval aviators—First Lieutenants Raul Ferreira de Vianna Bandeira and Antônio Augusto Schorcht, and Second Lieutenant Victor de Carvalho e Silva—were breveted on 24 October 1916. In December, First Lieutenant Virgínius Brito de Lamare completed the course, rounding out the class. All had attended the Brazilian School of Aviation of 1914, except Schorcht. In April 1917, Hoover returned to the United States due to his country's entry into the war, leaving instruction to Lieutenants Schorcht and Lamare. President Venceslau Brás attended the brevetting of the first aerial observers on 2 April 1917, an occasion that is considered the first presidential flight in a Brazilian military aircraft. The first regulations of the EAvN were approved that same year. Among the students were some Army officers, as the Army did not yet have its own school. In August, the School was transferred to Rijo Island, where the facilities proved unsatisfactory. Operations returned to Enxadas Island in December 1917.

=== First World War experience ===
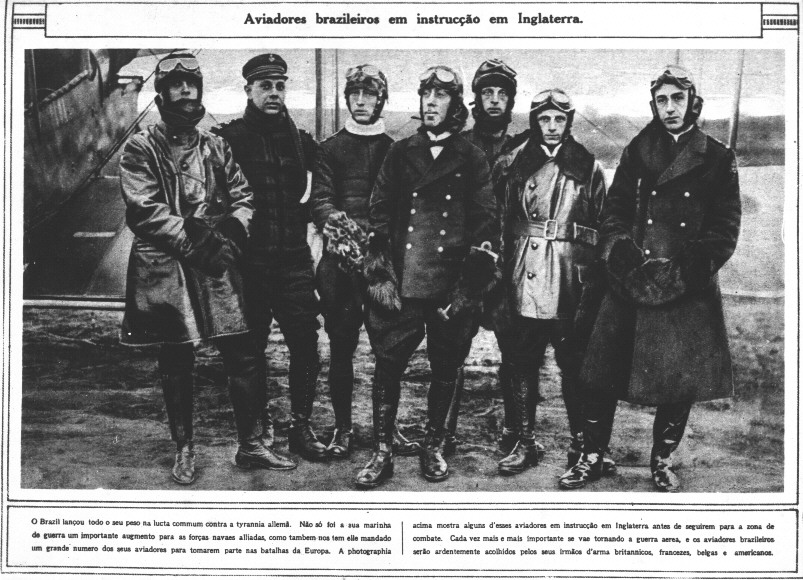
Brazilian naval aviators in the United Kingdom

Brazil declared war on Germany in October 1917, joining the First World War on the side of the Allies. The Brazilian government participated in an Inter-Allied Conference in Paris, at which Italy, the United Kingdom, and the United States agreed to train Brazilian naval aviators, on the condition that they would serve those countries in the war at the end of their training. The British, occupied with dozens of squadrons and struggling to replace pilots, were particularly interested in this arrangement. Brazilian Naval Aviation already had more aircraft than pilots and only sent volunteers.

Two officers and one petty officer trained with the United States Navy air service, where they flew in anti-submarine patrols in the North Atlantic. Six officers, four sergeants, and two corporals went to Italy, where they never saw combat. Eight officers (one of them from the Army) studied at the aviation schools of the Royal Navy and the British Army, arriving at the time when the British Royal Air Force (RAF) was being organized. One of them, Lieutenant Eugênio Possolo, died in a training accident. The rest were incorporated into RAF Squadrons 237 and 238, based near Plymouth, which flew anti-submarine patrols in the English Channel. At the end of the war, Brazil had a nucleus of aviators trained abroad, some with real combat experience, and received an American naval air instruction mission, led by Lieutenant Captains P. A. Cussachs and Jayme Oliver.

== Government policy ==
=== First Brazilian Republic ===
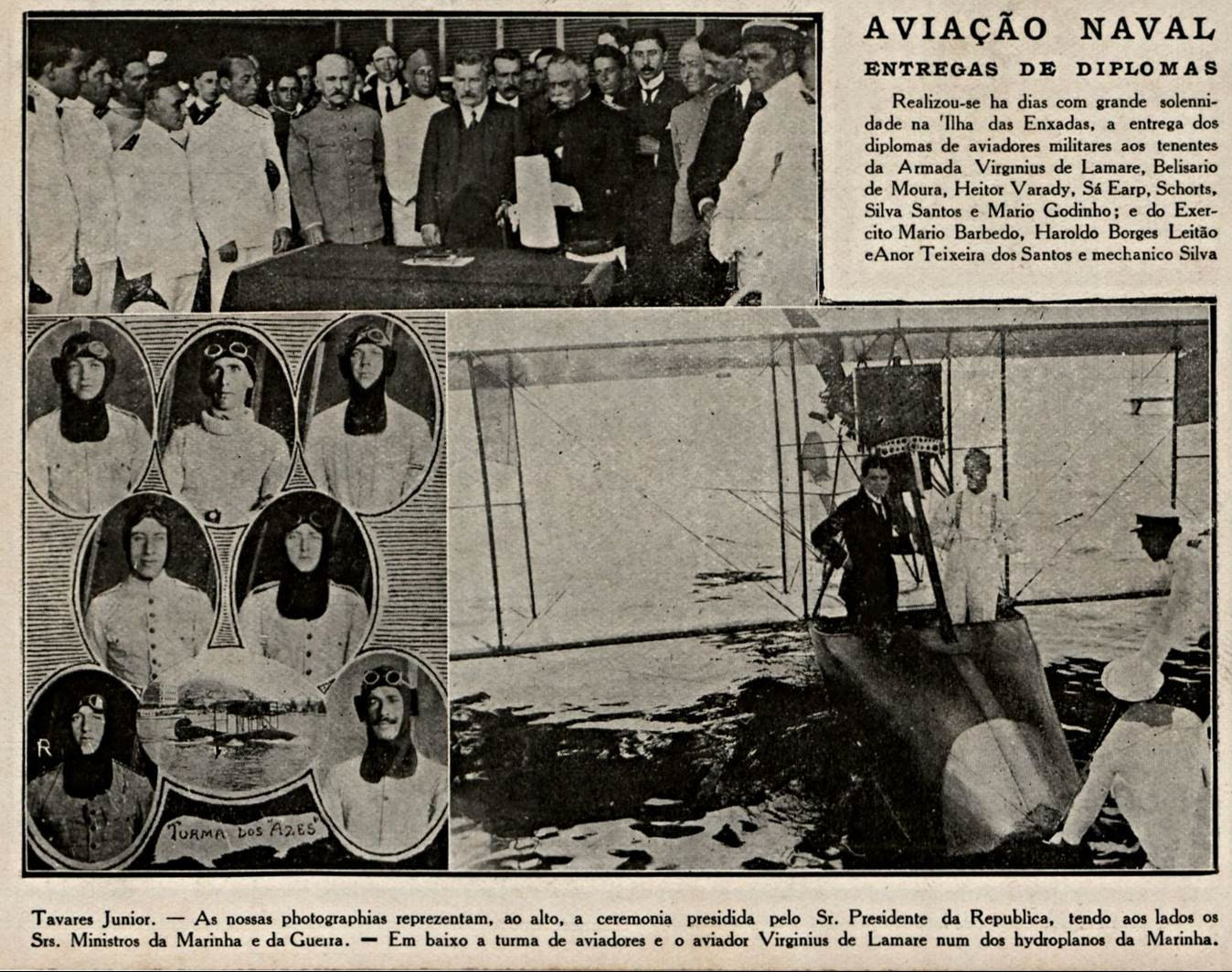
President Venceslau Brás attending the brevet ceremony of April 1917

Military aviation was introduced in Brazil amid debates on the modernization of the Armed Forces. The renewal was driven by the purchase of aircraft abroad, in the same way that capital ships had been acquired in previous years. One can speak of a "modernizing-consumerist ideology". Navy Minister Antônio Coutinho Gomes Pereira stated in the 1919 ministerial report that the air service was expensive but important. Alexandrino de Alencar, in the 1923 report, argued that aeronautics would be an efficient option for countries with few resources and extensive coastlines and borders. In 1920, Congress expanded the Navy's budget and included funds for Naval Aviation. The trend for the rest of the decade would be budget scarcity. The demands of Naval Aviation grew, but not the Navy's budget.

The leading figure of Naval Aviation in early 1920s Brazil was Captain Protógenes Guimarães, appointed Director of Naval Aeronautics when that office was created in 1923. Guimarães had family ties and close relations with Minister Alencar and was a well-known enthusiast of aviation. Politically, he was regarded as a trustworthy government loyalist since the first tenentist revolts in 1922, when he commanded the Naval Battalion. Even though he was not an aviator, Guimarães flew with his subordinates and championed their demands, gaining the sympathy of much of the pilot corps. In July 1924, he requested resignation from his office due to disagreements with Minister Alencar, who refused to extend to Navy pilots the same financial compensation given to their Army counterparts. The government employed aviation in operations against new tenentist revolts.

Switching sides, Guimarães led a conspiracy to rally the fleet and overthrow the Artur Bernardes government. The plot was uncovered by the police, and its leader was arrested in October 1924. Naval Aviation was punished: the Directorate of Aeronautics had its activities provisionally suspended from 26 November 1924 to 23 December 1925, and there were no enrollments at the Naval Aviation School for a year. The difficulties did not entirely halt its development: technological momentum outweighed internal resistance, to the point that in 1926 the Navy General Staff protested that "Naval Aviation has evolved in defiance of this NGS".

Special funds were released in early 1927 for the renewal of the air fleet. On the eve of the Revolution of 1930, the Washington Luís government made emergency purchases for Naval Aviation, but the orders would only arrive after his overthrow. At the time of the revolution that would bring Getúlio Vargas to power until 1945, Naval Aviation was disorganized and lacking in personnel and equipment. Command posts were occupied by officers with no aviation background, and the general mood was one of discouragement.

=== Vargas era ===
Assembly of a Focke-Wulf Fw 58 aircraft at Galeão

The new government was a period of advances in the Brazilian aviation sector as a whole. There was a state project not only for investment in aviation but also for the promotion of an aeronautical mindset; Vargas himself was regarded as a leader interested in flight. Aerial warfare during the revolutions of 1930 and 1932 revived the military air services, proved their strategic value, and highlighted the shortage of resources. For its goals of national integration, the government also relied on aviation through the Naval Air Mail and the Military Air Mail.

Protógenes Guimarães was pardoned, promoted to admiral, and appointed to the Ministry of the Navy between 1931 and 1935. He and other naval aviators, such as Raymundo Vasconcellos de Aboim, were among the leaders of the naval reform of the Vargas period. In 1935, Guimarães requested in his report to the president that special attention be given to Naval Aviation, due to the territorial extent of the country. The aircraft inventory had grown but suffered losses and lacked spare parts and trained personnel. The National Exhibition of the Estado Novo in 1938, the first major exhibition of this phase of the Vargas era, included a Naval Aviation exhibit in the Navy pavilion. In the 1939 budget year, the Ministry of the Navy spent about 10% of its allocation on Naval Aviation, compared to 2.5% of the Ministry of War's budget on Military Aviation and 3% of the Ministry of Transport and Public Works' budget on civil aviation.

In industrial and foreign policy, import substitution and "pendular diplomacy" were decisive for the Navy's aviation cycle. The issue of the future of the aeronautical industry was raised at the First National Aeronautics Congress in 1934. The view of naval aviators, represented by Commander Aboim, proposed investment in personnel training, including sending officers abroad, followed by the purchase of equipment and the installation of factories. Aboim reference was the Japanese industry. Under Admiral Aristides Guilhem's administration at the Ministry of the Navy, Aboim, as director of material for Naval Aviation, visited the United States and Germany. In the latter, he negotiated with an aircraft manufacturer, Focke-Wulf, for the installation of an aircraft factory and the licensed production of its models at Galeão.

=== Creation of the Brazilian Air Force ===
Getúlio Vargas at the inauguration of Santos Dumont Airport

Throughout this entire period, the air services of the Army and Navy had no administrative connection, each under its respective ministry. This lasted until 20 January 1941, when Vargas signed the decree creating the Ministry of Aeronautics. All personnel, aircraft, and related facilities of the two air branches were transferred to what would become the Brazilian Air Force (FAB), administered by the new body. Behind the decision was a group of military officers close to the president, proponents of an autonomous air power inspired by air forces such as the RAF and the Luftwaffe. Prominent figures of Naval Aviation, such as Schorcht and Lamare, took part in the campaign for the unified "Air Ministry".

According to naval aviator Francisco Teixeira, most aviator officers of both services wanted unification and believed that the Army and Navy hindered their technical and professional development. There was a common esprit de corps among aviators, distinct from their respective services, an enthusiasm for Europe's air forces, and the support of the press. But the Ministry of the Navy would not concede its aviation. The opinion of the Navy General Staff, drafted in 1939, acknowledged the aviators' complaints about the sector's lack of organization, but asserted that "the efficiency of the Navy requires the complete administrative independence of its own air forces". The 1941 ministerial report, sent to the president by Admiral Aristides Guilhem, defended the successes of Naval Aviation, such as aircraft construction.

There was an expectation of growing relevance of maritime patrol aviation in the Second World War, and the Army preferred that the Navy not accumulate political power from it. The Ministry of War accepted the measure, although it put forward a biased proposal that would unify aviation into a sub-secretariat controlled by the Army. From Vargas' perspective, the decision was influenced by the diplomatic realignment with the United States and the redistribution of political-military support bases.

== Aircraft ==
In the Brazilian Navy's official classification, the airplane—that is, "any aircraft heavier than air"—was distinguished as follows: the seaplane ("any airplane whose landing gear is designed to land and remain afloat on water"), the aeroplane ("any airplane whose landing gear is designed to land and remain on land"), the hydroaeroplane ("an aeroplane fitted with floats that allow it to land and remain on water"), and the flying boat ("the seaplane whose landing gear has the shape and construction of a boat"). The priority was for operations with seaplanes, but there was also training with land-based aircraft.

At the end of its first phase, in 1941, Brazilian Naval Aviation operated 99 aircraft of 15 types, all of American or European origin. Most were approaching obsolescence, and the newly created Brazilian Air Force scrapped many of them soon afterward. The Army's Military Aviation had a larger fleet, with 331 aircraft, but it was in the same qualitative condition.

=== Imports ===
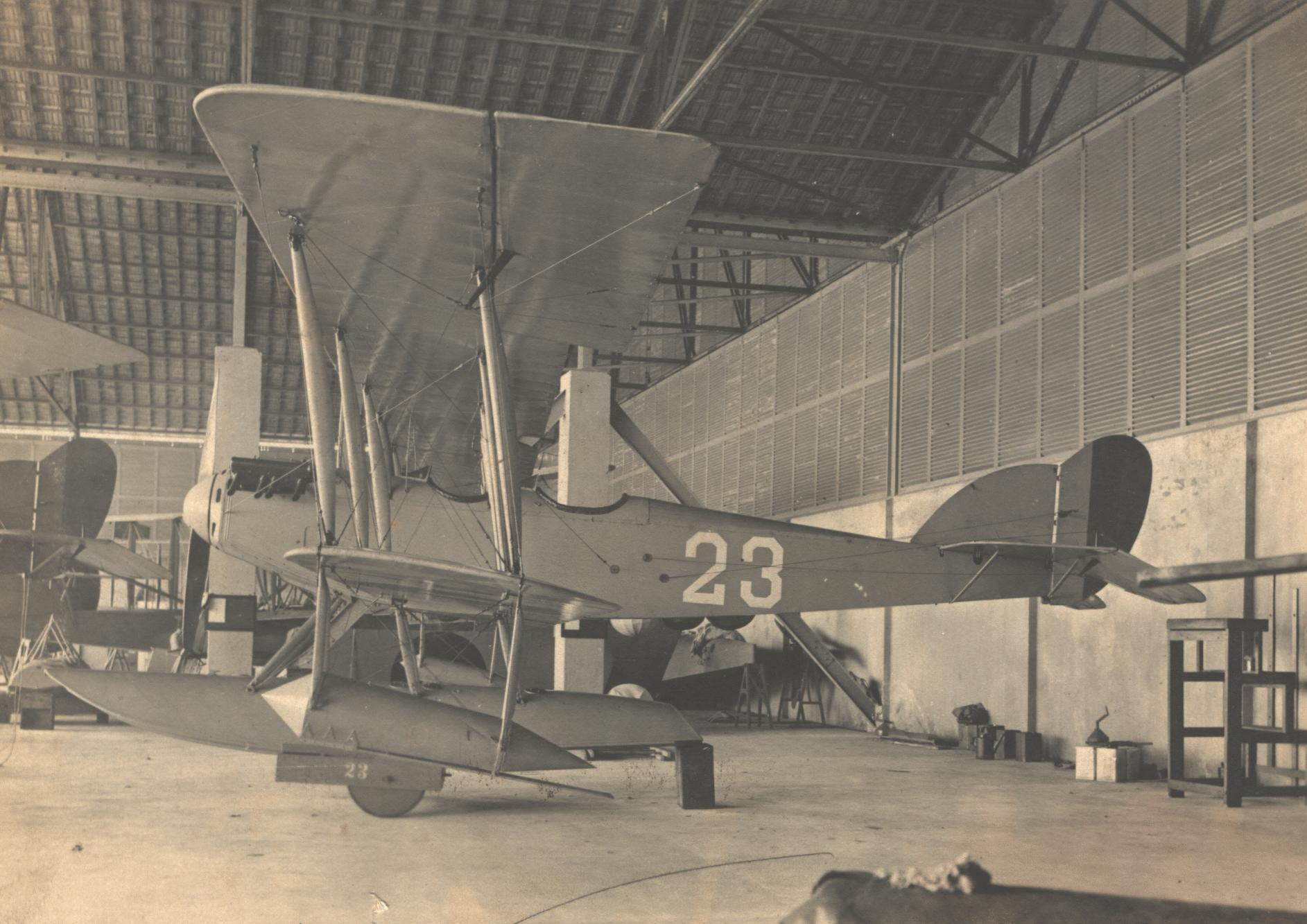
Curtiss N-9H seaplane

The Navy's first aircraft were Curtiss F Model 1914 flying boats—three initially, plus one assembled from parts of the earlier ones. At the end of the First World War, surplus aircraft were available and their usefulness had been proven. In 1918 and 1919, Naval Aviation received 35 aircraft of nine types, most of them unarmed training machines, but two models were genuine combat aircraft: the Macchi M.9, a bomber and reconnaissance plane, and the Curtiss HS-2L, a long-range bomber (with four hours and thirty minutes of endurance), capable of coordinating air operations with the High Seas Battle Fleet.

In the 1920s, efforts were made to standardize models and training. The Gosport system, developed in the United Kingdom, was implemented, under which initial training would be conducted in landplanes; thus, among the aircraft received in 1920 were five Avro 504Ks, the Navy's first land-based aircraft; twelve more would be acquired in the following years. Aircraft and instructors from the United States predominated, as they sent a Naval Mission to the Brazilian Navy in 1922. In 1926, the American representatives recommended prioritizing training aircraft, but the directive of the Navy General Staff was "that the most suitable type of aircraft is one that fulfills the threefold function of reconnaissance, bombing, and torpedoing". This was an ill-informed order, as there was no aircraft combining all those features.

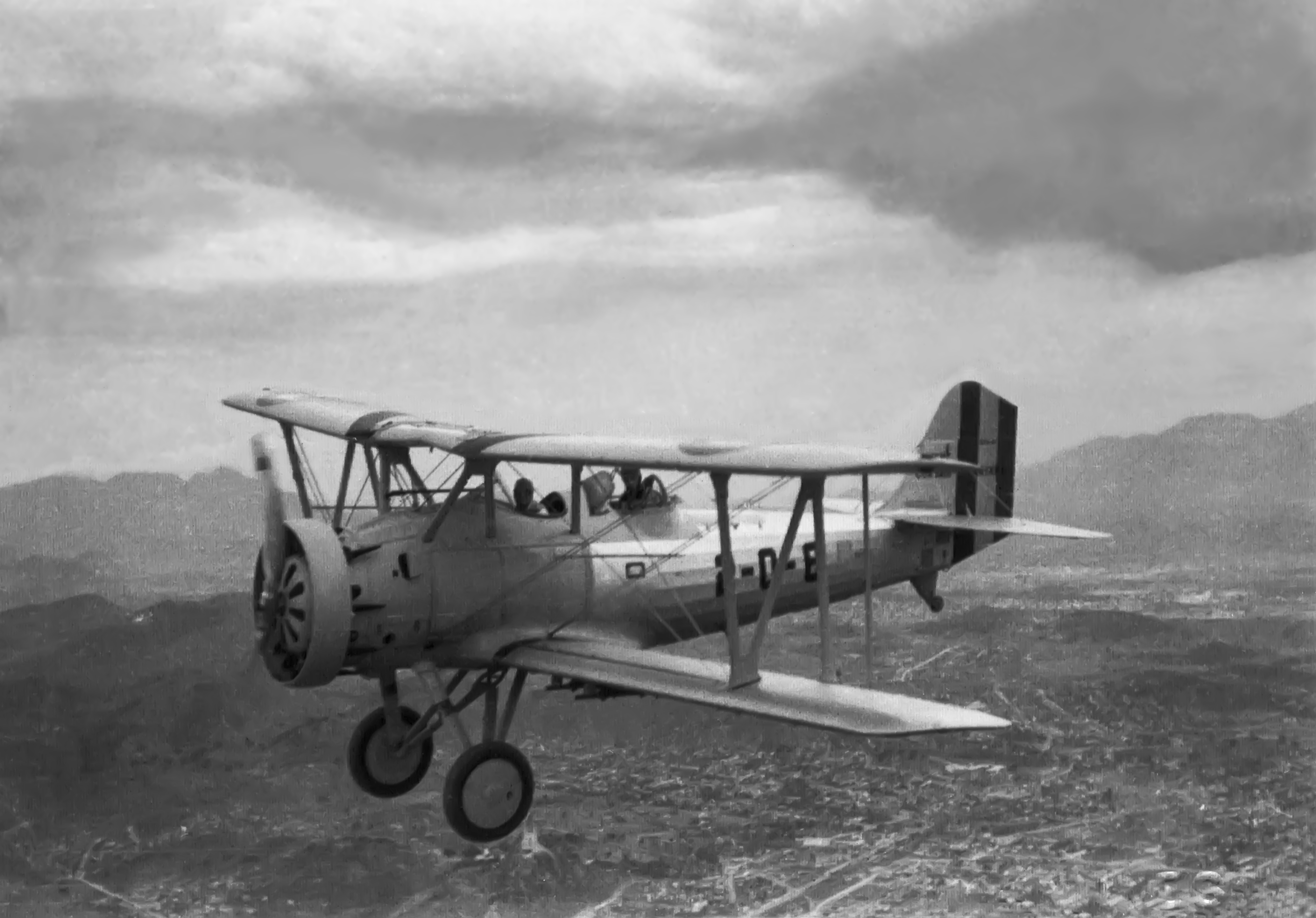
Vought V-66B Corsair

The heavy use of the fleet and the low budget took a toll on the availability of these aircraft; of the six Curtiss HS-2Ls from 1918, two had been lost by August 1921. At the beginning of 1924, only eight Sopwith Snipes, three Ansaldo SVA-10s, and three Curtiss F-5Ls from the fighter, reconnaissance, and bomber squadrons were in flying condition. With the cutbacks imposed on Naval Aviation, in 1926 the accumulated flight time of the Sopwith Snipes amounted to a mere 9 hours and 43 minutes. The mechanics and technical crews had much work, and fuel and other expenses were sometimes paid out of the servicemen's own pockets. Vice Admiral José Penido, head of the Navy General Staff in 1926, reported that Naval Aviation had skilled pilots, but lacked suitable aircraft for them to fly. From 1924 to 1930, only eight officers and three NCOs were breveted, and only 15 aircraft were received—a number smaller than the deactivations. By 1930, only 34 breveted officers and eighteen aircraft (most of them old training models) were available.

In 1931, patrol and bombing aircraft ordered by the previous government arrived, including eleven Savoia-Marchetti SM.55As, ferried across the Atlantic in a mass flight led by Italian Air Minister Italo Balbo. The SM.55As and the three Martin PM-1Bs were large, long-range seaplanes (with capacity for 400 kilograms of bombs and a 3,500-kilometer range, in the first case), representing the "heavy" striking power of Naval Aviation. Half of the Savoia-Marchettis were lost to accidents within just one year after delivery. Six Boeing 256s received the following year marked the peak of fighter aviation in the Navy.

Of the 143 aircraft imported from 1927 to 1935, sixty were grounded in the latter year due to a lack of spare parts and maintenance. In the final years of Naval Aviation, more aircraft were received for training, reconnaissance, transport, liaison, and general use, among them the Beechcraft D-17A, the first aircraft with retractable landing gear in Brazilian military aviation.

=== Galeão Factory ===
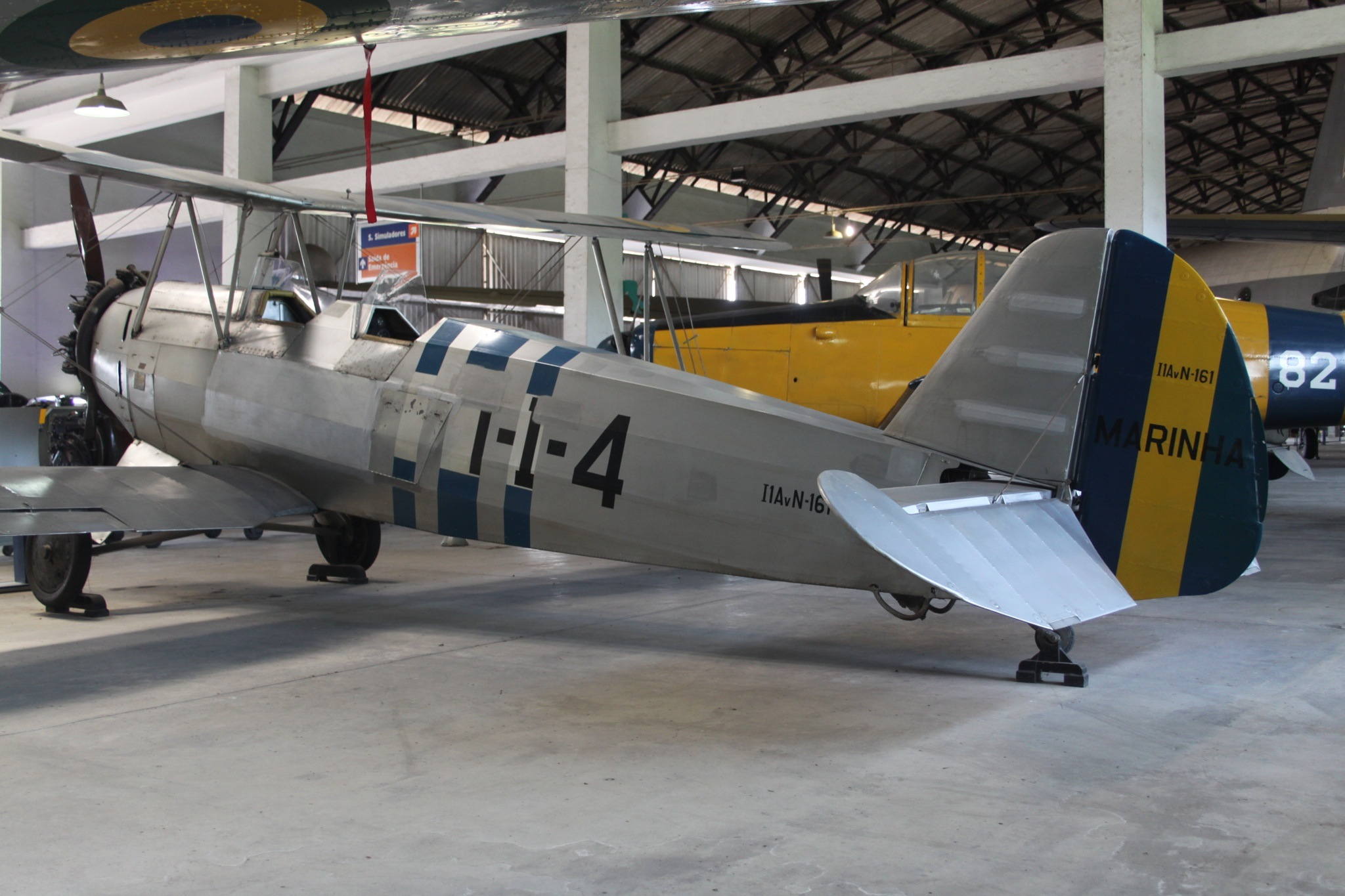
Focke-Wulf Fw 44 "Pintassilgo" in Brazilian Navy livery

The partnership with the German company Focke-Wulf Flugzeugbau GmbH resulted in the establishment of a factory at Galeão. The plan was to begin with simple assembly and gradually nationalize production. It was intended to build two training models, the Fw 44J Stieglitz and the Fw 56, a bomber, the Fw 58B Weihe, and a four-engine transport aircraft, the Fw 200 Condor. All kinds of specialized labor were lacking, and German technicians came to train a large number of Brazilian workers and engineers.

The first Stieglitz built in Brazil took off in January 1938. The factory produced, in total, 41 Fw 44Js (designated "Pintassilgo" in Brazilian service) and 26 Fw 58Bs, of which 16 were delivered to the Navy by 1941, and the rest to the FAB. The other plans were interrupted by the beginning of the Second World War and Brazil's subsequent alignment with the Allies. The Fw 44J replaced the DH.82 Tiger Moth at the Naval Aviation School and was the Navy's most numerous aircraft. One Fw 56 was even received at Galeão, but it was not registered and ended up being transferred to civil service.

=== List ===
List of Brazilian Navy aircraft (1916–1941)
Name	Role	Number	Period	Origin
Curtiss F mod. 1914	Training	4	1916 – 1923	United States
Borel	Training	1	1917 – 1919	France
Standard JH	Training	2	1918 – 1923	United States
FBA mod. B	Training	2	1918 – 1923	France
Curtiss HS-2L	Bomber	6	1918 – 1923	United States
Curtiss F mod. 1916	Training	4	1918 – 1923	United States
Farman F-41	Training	2	1919 – 1921	France
Curtiss N-9H	Training	9	1919 – 1926	United States
Ansaldo I.S.V.A	Training	2	1919 – 1921	Italy
Macchi M-9	Bomber	5	1919 – 1923	Italy
Macchi M-7	Training	3	1919 – 1923	Italy
Avro 504K	Training	17	1920 – 1930	United Kingdom
Aeromarine 40	Training	4	1920 – 1923	United States
Curtiss MF Seagull	Training	10	1920 – 1931	United States
Farman F-51	Bomber	2	1921 – 1923	France
Ansaldo SVA-10	Reconnaissance	18	1923 – 1928	Italy
Sopwith 7F.1 Snipe	Fighter	12	1923 – 1929	United Kingdom
Curtiss F-5L	Bomber	14	1923 – 1930	United States
Curtiss JN-4D Jenny	Training	4	1925 – 1928	United States
Consolidated NY-2 (D1C)	Training	3	1927 – 1933	United States
Consolidated PT-3 (D1C)	Training	1	1928 – 1932	United States
Avro 504N/O (I2A)	Training	6	1928 – 1934	United Kingdom
Martin PM-1B (P1M)	Patrol	3	1931 – 1938	United States
Vought O2U-2A Corsair (O1V)	Bomber	6	1931 – 1936	United States
Savoia Marchetti S.55A (P1S)	Bomber	11	1931 – 1936	Italy
Fairey Gordon (E1F)	Bomber	20	1931 – 1941	United Kingdom
De Havilland D.H.60T Moth Trainer (I1H)	Training	24	1931 – 1941	United Kingdom
Boeing 256 (C1B)	Fighter	6	1932 – 1941	United States
Vought V-66B Corsair (O2V)	Bomber	8	1933 – 1941	United States
Waco CSO (D1W)	Transport	8	1933 – 1941	United States
De Havilland D.H.82 Tiger Moth (I2H)	Training	5	1933 – 1941	United Kingdom
De Havilland D.H.82A Tiger Moth (I2H)	Training	12	1933 – 1941	United Kingdom
De Havilland D.H.83 Fox Moth (I3H)	Training	5	1933 – 1941	United Kingdom
Waco CJC (D2W)	Transport and general use	4	1935 – 1941	United States
Waco CPF-5 (D3W)	Transport and general use	10	1935 – 1941	United States
Focke Wulf Fw 44J Stieglitz (I1AvN)	Training	41	1936 – 1941	Germany
Focke Wulf Fw 58B Weihe (D2Fw)	Bomber	6	1938 – 1941	Germany
Luscombe Phantom (D1L)	Transport	1	1939 – 1941	United States
North American NA-46 (V1NA)	Training	12	1939 – 1941	United States
Beechcraft D-17A (D1Be)	Light transport	4	1940 – 1941	United States
Stinson 105 (D1S)	Training	1	1940 – 1941	United States

== Organization ==
=== Administration and facilities ===
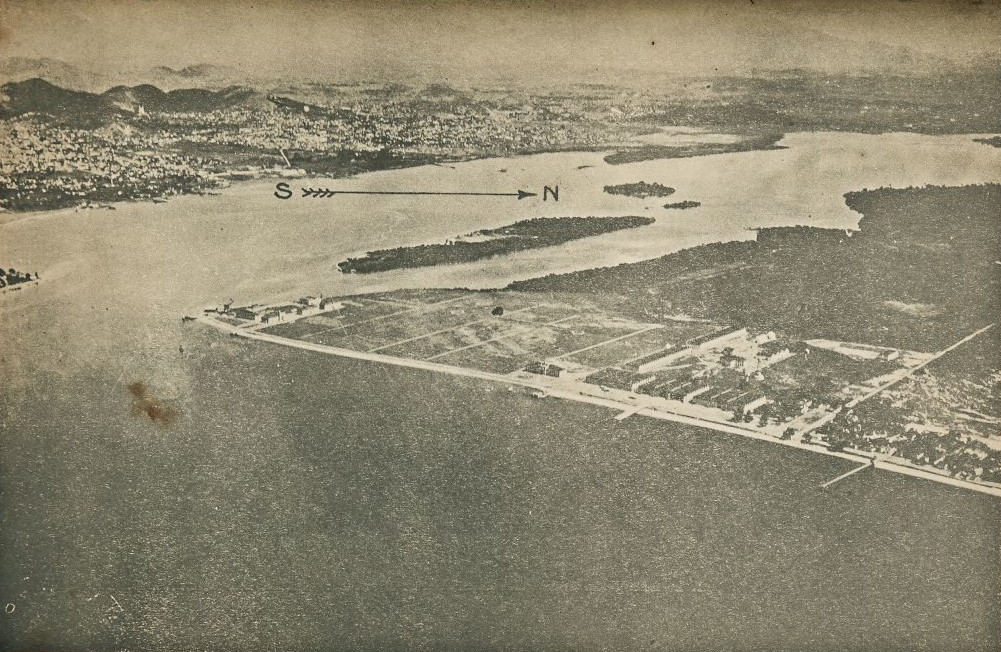
Aerial view of the Galeão Naval Air Base (1934)

At first, Naval Aviation consisted basically of the EAvN and its assets. The aircraft formed the Warplane Flotilla, subordinated to the fleet but operated by the Naval Aviation School, which in turn was subordinated to the Navy General Staff. In 1921, a project titled "Air Organization for the Defense of the Brazilian Coast" was approved, under which air units and Naval Aviation Centers and Posts would be established from the capital down to the south of the country—the term "air base" would only be adopted in the following decade.

A presidential decree of November 1923 subordinated the EAvN, the air units, and the centers—still under construction—to the Coastal Air Defense, inspired by the British Royal Naval Air Service. The following month, this body was replaced by the Directorate of Aeronautics of the Ministry of the Navy. The Directorate was the result of the influence of the American Naval Mission. It was linked to the Navy General Staff and functioned as an administrative and advisory body under the direct subordination of the Navy Minister. Beginning in 1932, it was also tasked with contacting civil aviation companies in case their personnel and equipment were mobilized.

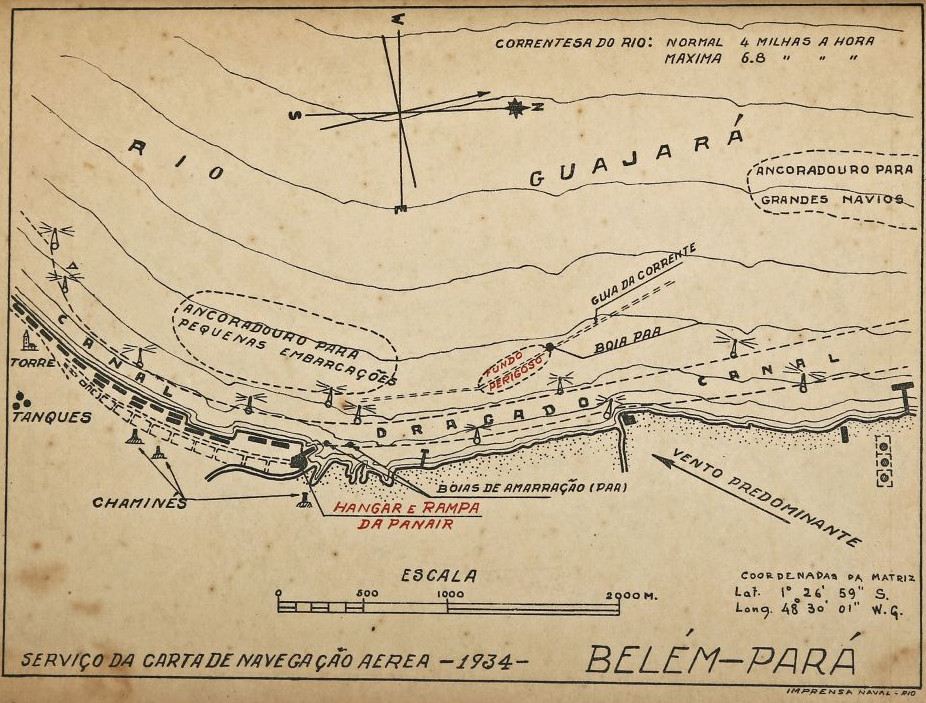
Aeronautical navigation chart of Belém

Naval Aviation Centers were established in Rio de Janeiro, Santos, and Florianópolis. To locate the Rio de Janeiro Naval Aviation Center (CAvNRJ), Ponta do Galeão on Governador Island was chosen, using land from the Apprentice Sailors' School. It would serve as the main link in the coastal air defense system and compensate for the lack of a runway for land-based aircraft at Enxadas Island, where the EAvN was based on the west side. The space was shared with the Naval Academy and was very limited: all the aircraft, workshops, magazines, and classrooms were squeezed into just six thousand square meters. Finally, the School itself was transferred to Galeão in 1924. There, an airfield for wheeled aircraft and large hangars were built, some of them facing the sea, where ramps allowed aircraft to be lifted. The Directorate of Aeronautics operated at Galeão until its transfer to the new Ministry of the Navy building in downtown Rio de Janeiro, in August 1935.

Three additional bases were established in Porto Alegre and Ladário in 1932, and in Belém in 1933. However, the list of operational bases and commanders in 1941 does not include any in Ladário and Belém. At Galeão, what was popularly called the "Aircraft Factory", beginning in 1936, was formally named the Naval Aviation General Workshops (OGAvN)—a misleading name, but one that indeed also served the purpose of maintaining the existing fleet.

=== Air units ===
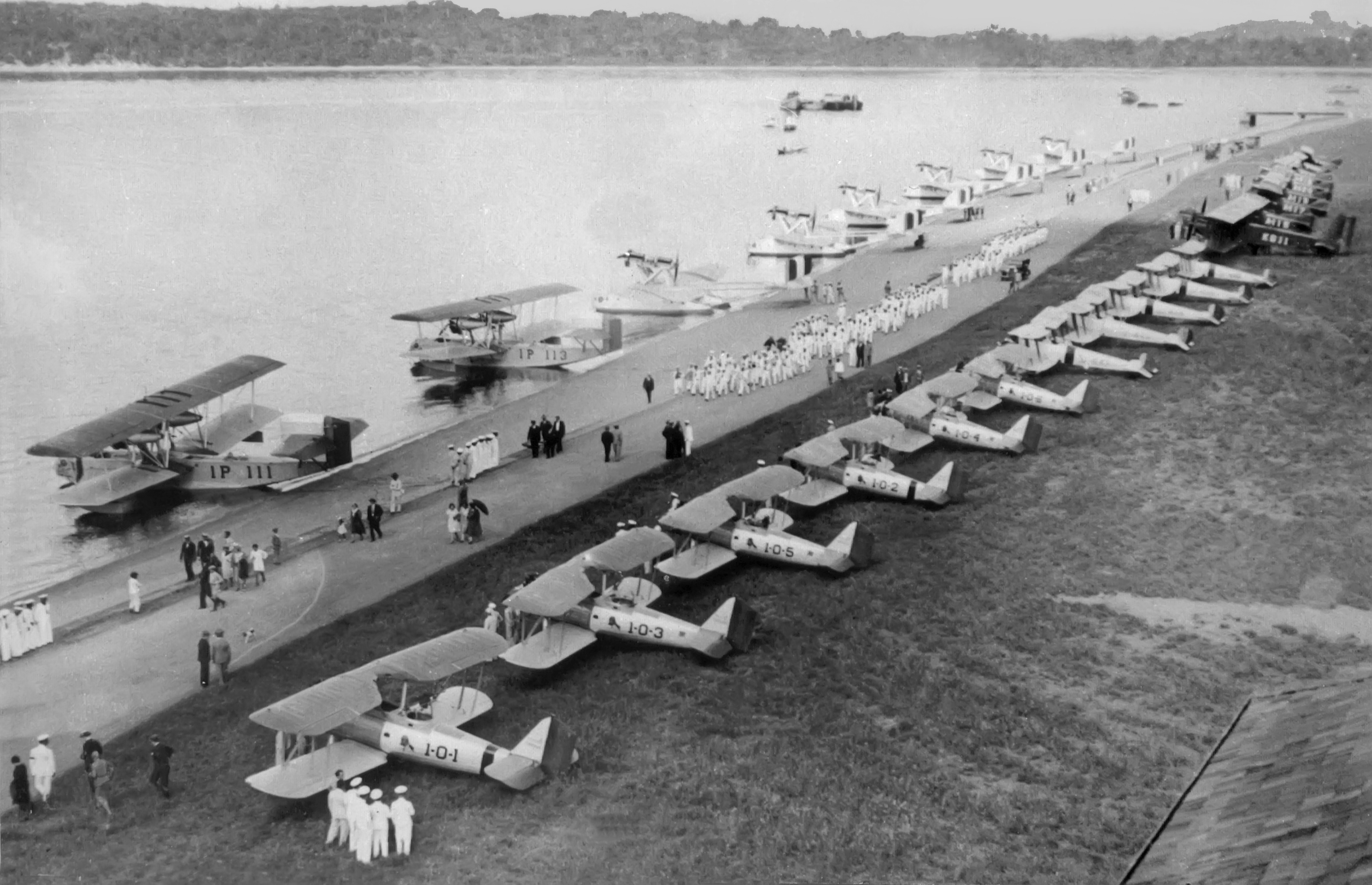
Incorporation of the Savoia-Marchetti S-55A (1931)

Documentation on the air units is incomplete. The first three squadrons were organized in 1923: bombing and patrol (Curtiss F-5L), reconnaissance (Ansaldo SVA-10), and fighter (Sopwith 7F-1 Snipe). In January 1926, they consisted of a Fighter Flotilla, with three squadrons of 7F.1 Snipes; a Reconnaissance Flotilla, with three squadrons of SVA-10s (grounded due to lack of pilots); a Bombing Flotilla, with three squadrons of F-5Ls; and a Training Flotilla, with three squadrons of Curtiss N-9Hs, Curtiss MFs, Avro 504Ks, and Curtiss JN-4Ds. The 1931 reorganization established an Independent Patrol Flotilla with the Savoia-Marchetti S.55As, an Independent Patrol Section with the Martin PM-1Bs, and an Independent Reconnaissance Section with the Vought Corsair. The training fleet consisted of Avro 504N/Os, Avro 504Ks, and Consolidated NY-2s.

The air units of the Naval Aviation Centers were grouped in June 1932 into the Coastal Defense Air Force. By December another organization was already in effect, separating the Coastal Air Defense (DAL) from the Fleet Air Force (FAE). The DAL consisted of the 1st Fighter Division (Boeing 256), 2nd Observation Division (Vought Corsair), and the 1st, 2nd, 3rd, and 4th Reconnaissance and Bombing Divisions (Fairey Gordon). The FAE consisted of the 1st Patrol Division (S.55A and Martin PM-1B), the 1st Observation Division (Vought Corsair), and the 1st Training Division.

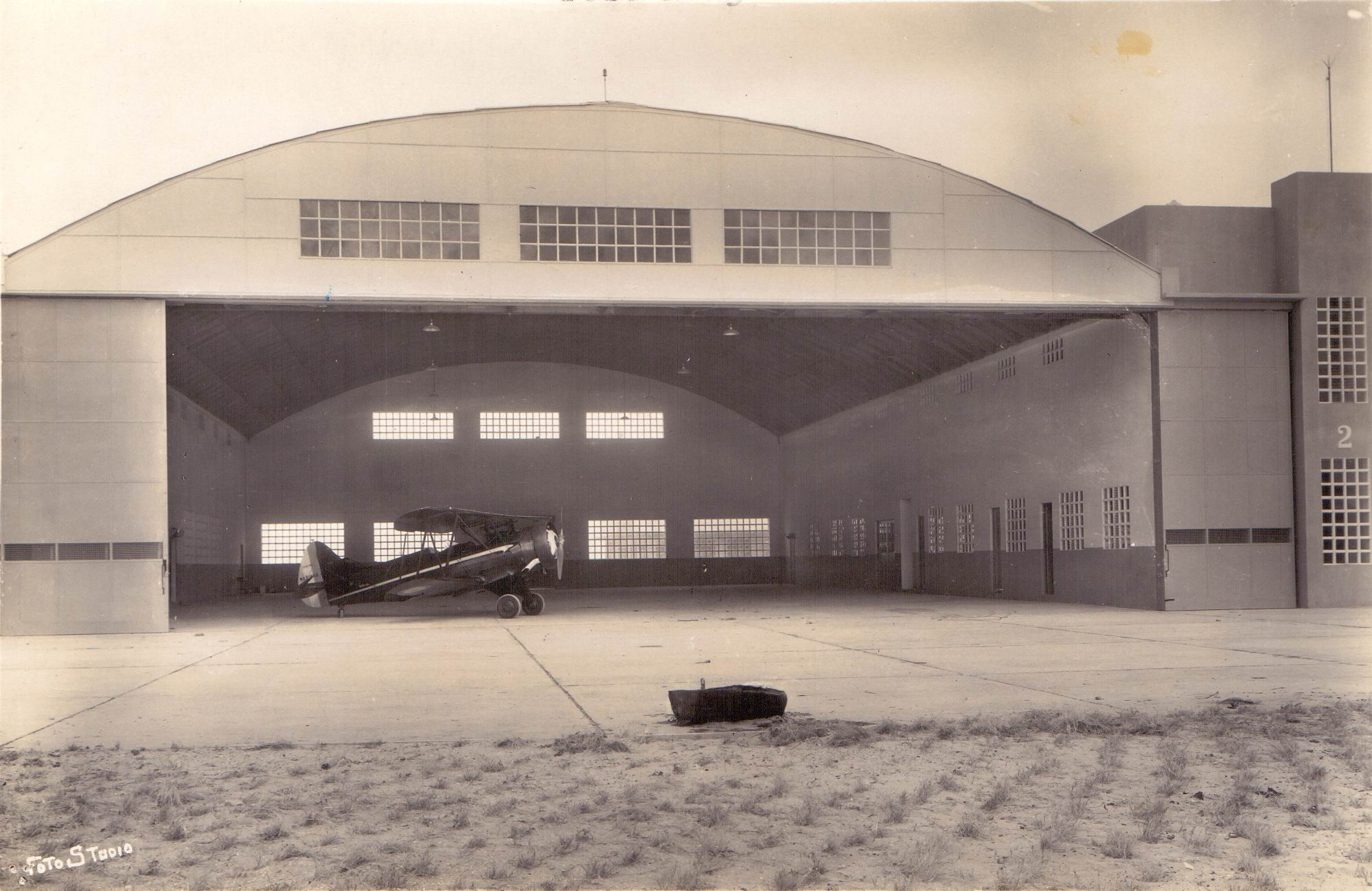
Hangar of the Rio Grande Naval Aviation Base

The following year, the Coastal Defense Air Force was geographically divided into five sectors, named North, Center, South, and Southwest, with headquarters in Natal, Rio de Janeiro, Florianópolis, and Ladário. The planned air sectors never left the drawing board, and the air units intended for them were disbanded in the same year. What was actually implemented was the Aviation Corps, consisting of the 1st Reconnaissance and Bombing Flotilla with the Fairey Gordons, the 1st Observation Flotilla with the Vought Corsairs, the 1st Bombing and Patrol Flotilla with the Martin PM-1Bs and Savoia-Marchetti S.55As, the Combat Aircraft Division with the Boeing 256s, and the Training Aircraft Division with the Waco CSOs. In 1933, the 1st, 2nd, and 3rd Reconnaissance and Attack Divisions, the 2nd Observation Division (Vought Corsair), and the 1st Fighter Division (Boeing 256) were active. The Fleet Air Force, headquartered at CAvNRJ, had two air units: the 1st Patrol Division (SM.55As and Martin PM-1Bs) and the 1st Observation Division (Vought Corsair).

A decree of August 1935 created the Navy Air Force (FAM), the "set of all aircraft and aircraft groupings in service with the Navy". It was formally divided between the Squadron Air Service and the Base Air Service. The latter was to consist of the Coastal Defense Air Force (FAL), the Base Air Units, Training Air Units, and Air Units for Special Services. With the wear and tear of the fleet, unit disbandments and reorganizations continued. In 1935, the 1st Fighter Division, 2nd Observation Division, and 1st Patrol Division were eliminated, and the 1st Mixed Group of Fighter, Observation, and Patrol Aircraft (GMCOP) and the 1st Reconnaissance and Bombing Division were created. To handle airmail, the Naval Mail Aircraft Division was created in 1936, later renamed the Independent Group of Naval Air Mail Aircraft and then the Southern Line Air Mail Aircraft Group. In 1937, the GMCOP was disbanded, giving way to the 1st Mixed Group of Observation and Fighter Aircraft and the 1st Reconnaissance and Bombing Group. The Focke-Wulf Fw 58Bs and North American NA-46s were organized in 1939 into the 1st and 2nd Military Training Squadrons.

=== Order of battle in 1941 ===
Organization of Naval Aviation in 1941
In the capital:
- Directorate-General of Naval Aeronautics (rear admiral Armando Figueira Trompowsky de Almeida)
- Naval Aviation School (captain of sea and war Heitor Varady)
- 1st Reconnaissance and Bombing Flotilla (lieutenant captain Francisco Teixeira)
- 1st Observation Flotilla (corvette captain Ismar Pfaltzgraff Brasil)
- 1st Bombing and Patrol Flotilla (frigate captain Fábio de Sá Earp)
- 1st Military Training Squadron (lieutenant captain Hélio Costa)
- 2nd Military Training Squadron (lieutenant captain José Kahl Filho)
- Rio de Janeiro Naval Aviation Base (frigate captain Antônio Appel Neto)
- Naval Aviation Workshops (corvette captain Henrique de Souza Cunha)
- Naval Aviation Medical Service (physician corvette captain Manoel Ferreira Mendes)

In the states:

- Santos Naval Aviation Base (corvette captain Antônio Azevedo de Castro Lima)
- Florianópolis Naval Aviation Base (corvette captain Epaminondas Gomes dos Santos)
- Rio Grande Naval Aviation Base (corvette captain Luiz Leal Netto dos Reys)

== Personnel ==
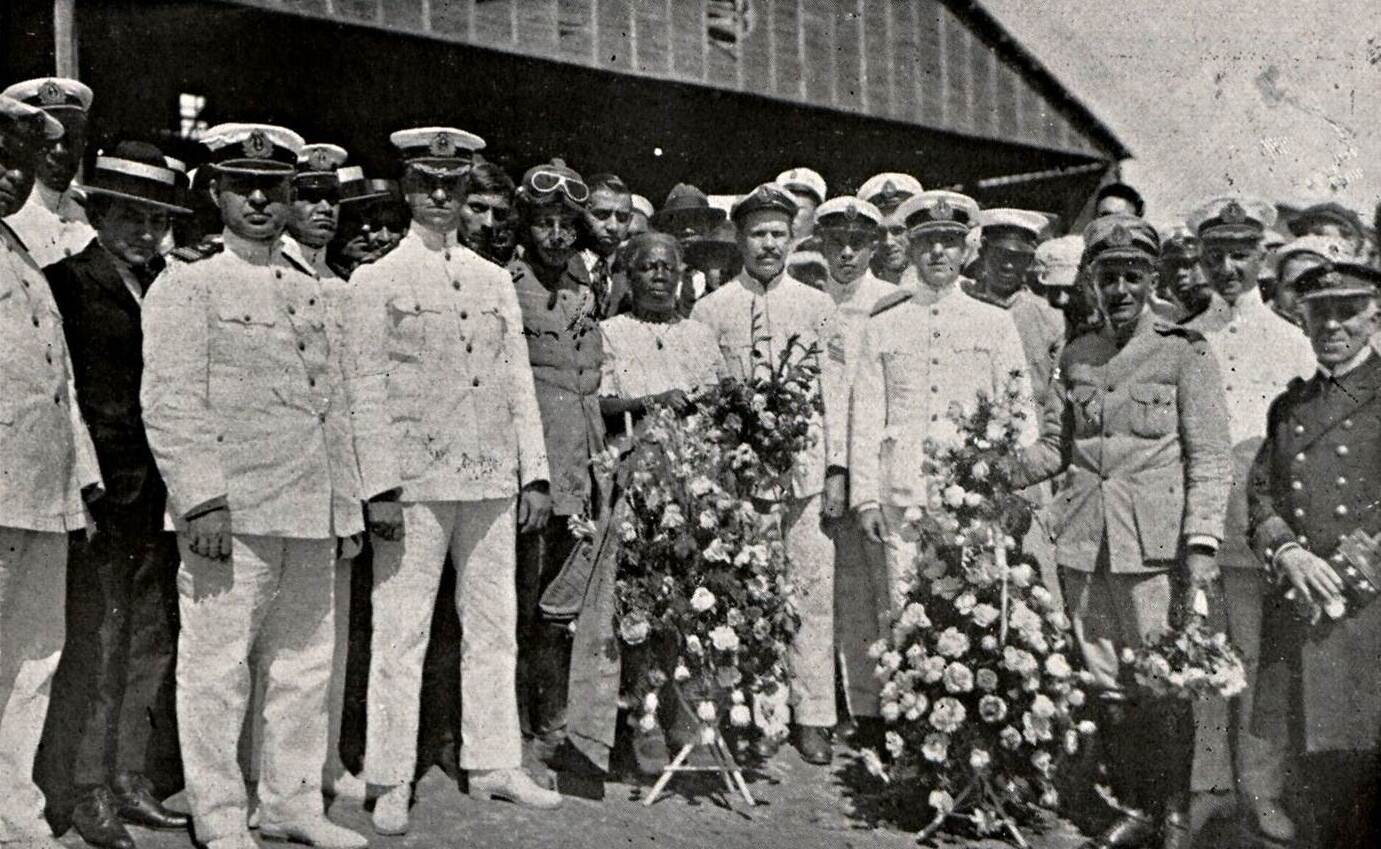
Aviators and senior naval officers on Enxadas Island (1923)

Pilot-aviators, observers, mechanics, and specialist workers were trained at the Naval Aviation School. Its 1917 regulations allowed petty officers and sergeants to enroll in the aviator and naval observer courses, but specified that they would only be taught the basic notions. In the 1926 regulations, the School offered three courses: naval aviator, for officers and civilians; naval pilot, for sergeants; and artificer, for corporals.

Initially, there was no naval aviator career path. Navy officers interested in flying had to step away from shipboard service, which delayed their promotions. Later, the Navy Command required the completion of flight hours in the curriculum, but this did not solve the issue of promotions. Most of the posts were therefore filled by enlisted men—sergeants and even corporals. Minister Alexandrino de Alencar decreed in 1917 that flight days would be counted as sea days for promotion purposes. His successor revoked the measure, asserting: "we do not possess a corps of aviators, only Navy officers who temporarily attend the Aviation School and practice in the airplane flotilla".

In 1921, the EAvN regulations distinguished between "Chart A", the permanent corps of career officers, and a cadre of reserve aviators, civilians coming from aeroclubs. After their training, they would serve for at least five years in active military service. The reservists would later be organized into the Corps of Naval Air Reserve Officers, consisting of flying personnel (officers) and technical personnel (officers, petty officers, and enlisted men). The Second Category Naval Air Reserve, created in 1933, came from the Nautical Sports Associations.

=== Aviation Corps ===
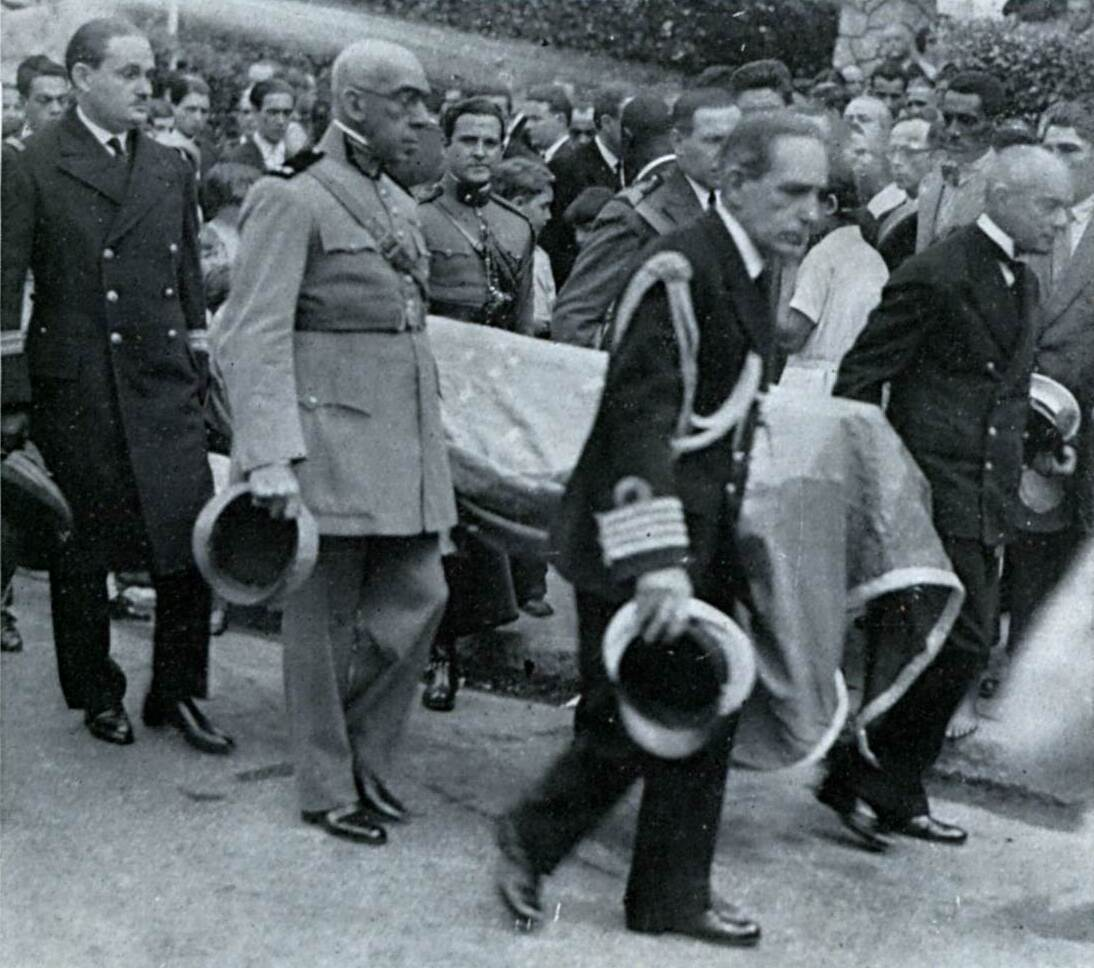
Funeral of one of the victims of a collision between two Savoia-Marchetti flying boats (1931)

A specific personnel framework for Naval Aviation emerged in 1931, with the establishment of the Naval Aviation Corps, the Naval Aviators Corps, and the Naval Aviation Medical Service. The measure represented a four-year delay compared to the Army, which had already organized its Military Aviation as a branch in 1927, thereby ensuring aviators a career path. In the Naval Aviation Corps, defined by the decree of 3 October, officers formed the Naval Aviators Corps, while petty officers and enlisted men formed the corps of pilot-aviators, gunners, boilermakers, carpenters, meteorologists, assemblers, drivers, photographers, and telegraphers. The criteria for officer promotion included flight hours. The division of activities between officers and enlisted men was greater than in the equivalent functions in the Army.

According to the ministerial report, Naval Aviation had 43 officers, 49 petty officers, and 89 enlisted men in 1931. Complaints about a shortage of aeronautical personnel appeared in official documents and continued to be raised even after 1931. The decree set the numbers of officers as follows: one rear admiral, two captains, six commanders, 18 lieutenant commanders, 18 lieutenants, 18 sub-lieutenants, and 18 ensigns. The inclusion of a general is noteworthy. In 1933, the rank of ensign was eliminated and the number of sub-lieutenants increased to 27. In the 1932 reorganization of the Navy's officer corps, naval aviation was a specialty that could include officers both from the Line Corps and from the Engineers Corps.

At the end of this historical phase, in 1941, Naval Aviation personnel comprised 156 officers and 267 petty officers and enlisted men. Among the officers were aviators, reservists, supply officers, and medical officers, and among the enlisted men, aviation, radio, and armament mechanics, handlers, and nurses. There were also civilians: draftsmen, clerks, aviation workers, and others.

=== Esprit de corps ===
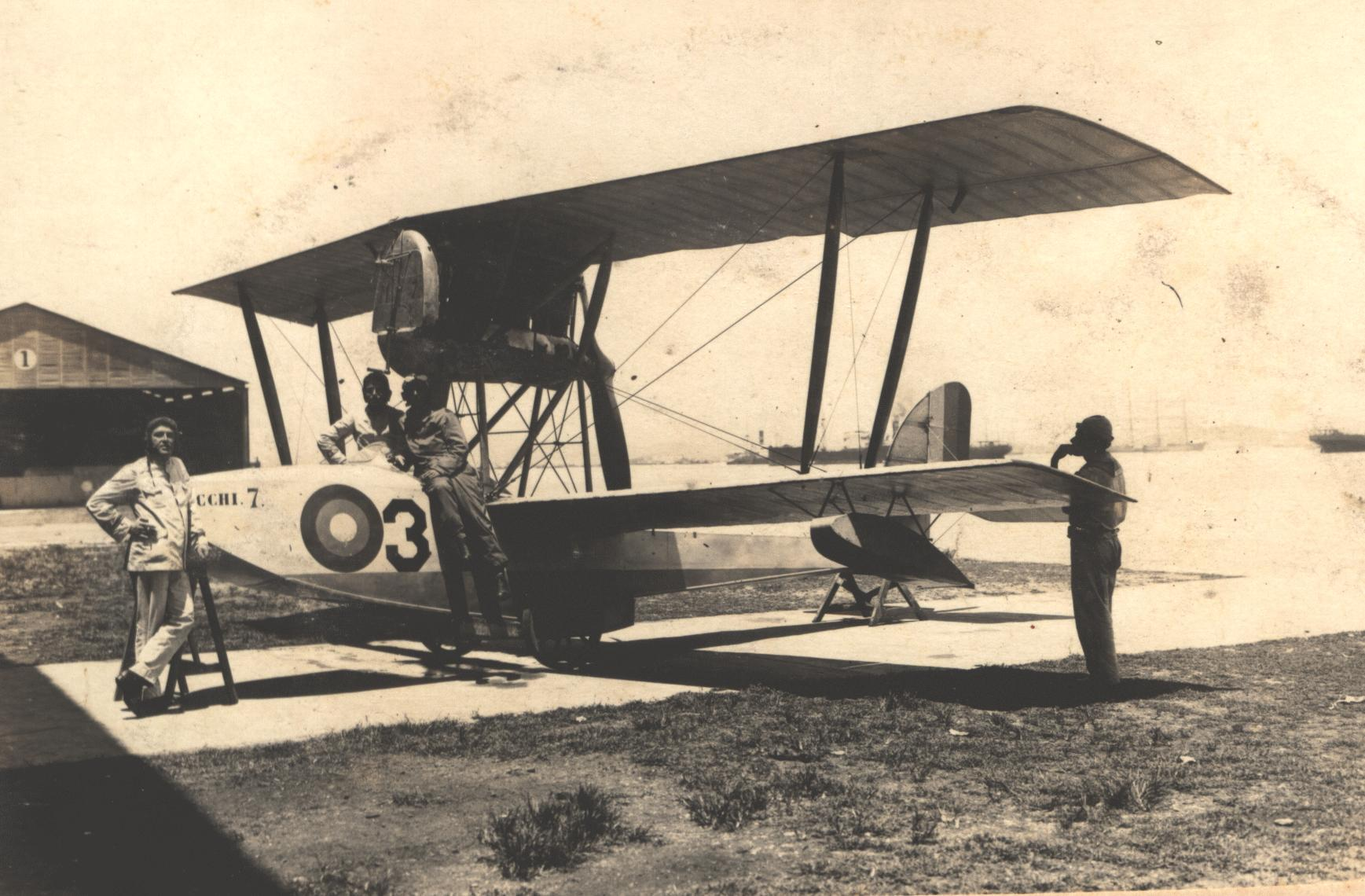
Crew of a Macchi M-7 flying boat

Informally, naval aviators were called "princes in skirts", because they wore long leather coats to protect themselves from wind, rain, and cold. Protógenes Guimarães, therefore, was called the "king of the princes in skirts". Some were part of the group known as the "Archdukes", young officers with training in the United States who advocated structural and doctrinal advances, similar to the Army's Young Turks.

Beginning in 1931, the consolidation of the personnel framework fostered a spirit of independence among aviators, as had occurred with Army aviators, who maintained ties of friendship with their counterparts in the Navy. The aviators distanced themselves from the Fleet Corps, and therefore, from the Navy itself. They qualified as a well-trained technical body, but they did not receive differentiated treatment within the personnel structure. Not all officers absorbed the aviation culture. According to one air force brigadier (a former admiral), "the seeds of distrust began in the mid-1920s and, because the new branch was not embraced by the Brazilian naval environment, the paths grew apart". Navy officers had little information about technological innovation, except for those involved with modernization or those who attended the Naval War College.

The Army and Navy aviation branches were reputed to be the least disciplined segments of the Armed Forces. According to Francisco Teixeira, he chose naval aviation in 1933 because it was "a refuge for free spirits, for the somewhat undisciplined". Memoirs tend to exaggerate the mistakes of the pre-1941 period, but newspapers from before that year do indeed report many inquiries to investigate misconduct. Superior orders, such as the ban on low flights, were often ignored, as on 26 May 1934, when the pilot of a Waco 89 broke its wing on the mast of the Touring Club tower after flying over Mauá Square. There was even participation in rebel movements and administrative irregularities. In May 1937, for example, the Rio de Janeiro police uncovered a gasoline theft scheme at the Galeão base.

In 1958, an admiral assessed in retrospect this first generation of naval aviators:

The Navy aviators came to constitute a separate group, whose members generally regarded themselves much more as aviators than as Navy officers, living apart from the ships and even wearing different uniforms, which ended up nullifying one of the main factors of effectiveness in their training—the seamanship skills, acquired and refined through the full practice of naval duties. Such a mistake should not be repeated.

== Operations ==
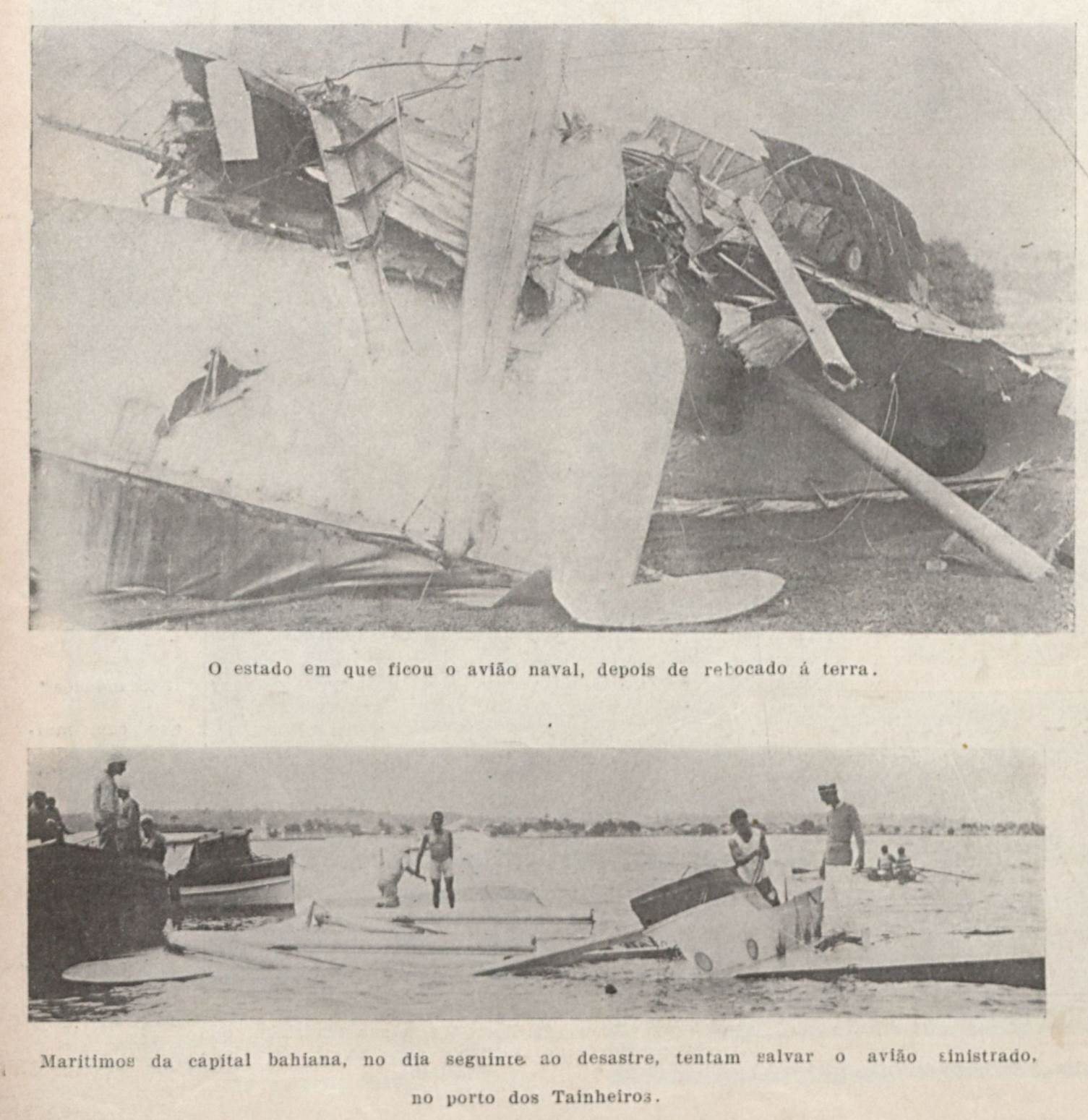
Wreckage of a crashed Savoia-Marchetti in Salvador (1932)

The primary mission of Naval Aviation was the aerial patrol of the Brazilian coastline, already officially mentioned since the EAvN regulations of 1917. The law referred to the defense of ports, reconnaissance, pursuit of enemy aircraft, attacks on fortifications, communications, depots, and other targets, as well as artillery fire observation. Seaplanes were to be auxiliary elements to surface ships. In the 1930s, experiments were already underway with possibilities such as smoke deployment for naval-tactical purposes.

Despite the rise of aircraft carriers in the interwar period, in Brazil such ships never moved beyond theoretical debate, nor did a carrier aviation branch emerge. (Note: The naval program proposed in 1923 included an aircraft carrier, and some preliminary studies from late 1922 considered the conversion of two merchant ships into aircraft carriers. The plans did not move forward, and there was little interest among the officer corps in this class of ship.) The fleet never had a ship equipped with catapult-launched aircraft, not even among its capital ships. The Navy General Staff, in a 1939 opinion, foresaw that coastal air bases and aircraft embarked on battleships and cruisers would suffice for Brazilian needs. Naval strategists stated that "the Aviation we need for carrying out our naval operations does not need to be based on the aircraft carrier; with greater tactical and strategic advantages, consistent with the character of our operations, Naval Aviation will be based at coastal land bases". Off the record, the only Brazilian seaplane carrier was the tender Belmonte, which embarked an NY-2 in September 1931. This would be the first embarked operation of a Brazilian Navy aircraft.

In naval air operations of the time, indiscipline and lack of resources for maintenance resulted in a high mortality rate from accidents. Plane crashes were frequent news in the press. Navy officers attended in large numbers the "Wing Week" of 1936, promoted by the Army in honor of fallen aviators. The Revista da Aviação Naval summarized the common medical problems of the profession: blindness, deafness, kidney stones, and inner ear disturbances, among others, arising from air displacement, the clash of hot and cold air currents, engine noise, rapid changes in altitude and pressure, sudden movements, body posture in flight, and fluid intake restriction. In 1939, the journal translated an article from the Italian Rivista Aeronautica on the need for psychological monitoring of pilots.

=== Raids ===
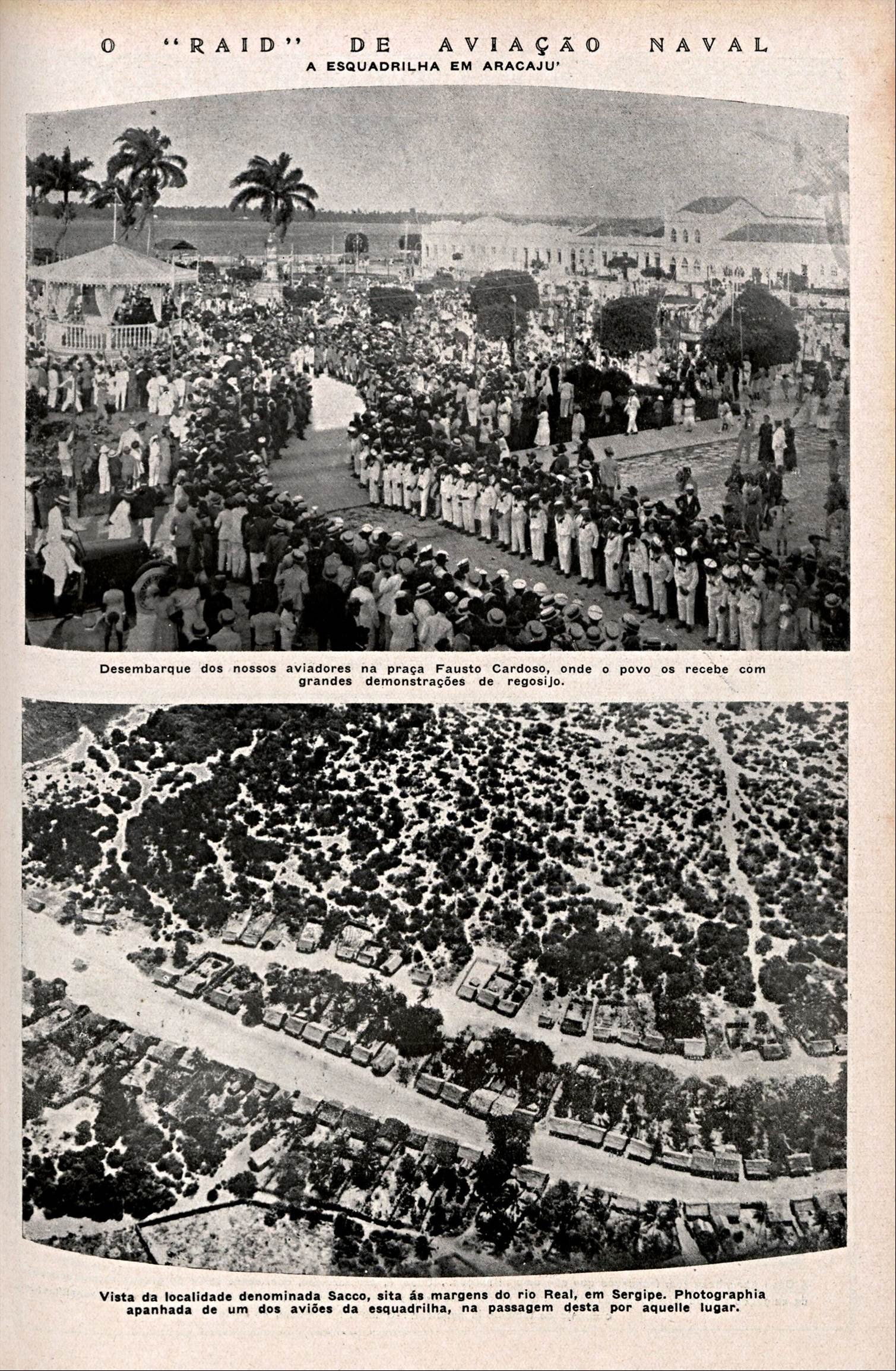
The July–August 1923 raid: above, the reception of the squadron in Aracaju, and below, an aerial photograph of a village in Sergipe

In the early years of Naval Aviation, aviators carried out long-distance flights of worldwide repercussion, the raids. Some were undertaken by the Navy, both to make headlines and to develop the pilots' skills. The first raid of Naval Aviation was carried out by Protógenes Guimarães and Orthon Hoover in a Curtiss F on 12 October 1916. They covered the round trip between the EAvN and the Naval College of Angra dos Reis in four days, a distance that would not have required more than two hours in each direction under favorable weather: winds delayed the return trip and forced a water landing in Sepetiba Bay, where a search and rescue operation—the first for an aircraft in Brazil—was needed, along with the delivery of gasoline so they could take off again.

On 4 December 1916, Guimarães and Schorcht took off in a Curtiss F bound for Campos, with stops in Cabo Frio, Búzios, Macaé, and Barcelos. A cylinder of the engine exploded over Cabo de São Tomé, and they had to wait for the delivery of another engine in São João da Barra. The round trip took a month, but the journey led to the creation of the Campista Aviation Club. On 15 August 1919, two Curtiss HS-2Ls flew to Ilha Grande to deliver correspondence to the fleet during maneuvers. One of the aircraft was forced to alight near Arpoador and was destroyed by the waves. In October of the same year, another aircraft of the same model became the first military aircraft to visit Santos, after a four-hour and twenty-minute flight.

The missions also served to open commercial routes. The great South American challenge was the Rio de Janeiro–Buenos Aires air link, which the Navy attempted in October 1920. A Macchi M-9bis flying boat, which did not belong to Naval Aviation, departed on the 6th crewed by Lieutenant Lamare and Petty Officer Antônio Joaquim da Silva Júnior. On the 20th, upon arriving in Rio Grande, the aircraft was destroyed when the cable of the crane hoisting it from the water snapped. The route would ultimately be conquered by civilians. In September 1921, Lieutenant Petit and photographer Jorge Kfuri conducted an aerial survey over the coast and lake region of the state of Rio de Janeiro, collecting data for the preparation of hydrographic charts and organizing a support point in Cabo Frio. The photographer would later be hired for subsequent photo-surveys.

On 17 June 1922, ten aircraft welcomed Portuguese aviator Gago Coutinho at the conclusion of his transatlantic raid Lisbon–Rio de Janeiro, the most significant of its time. Brazilian Corvette Captain Virgínio de Lamare sought government support to repeat the feat in the reverse direction.

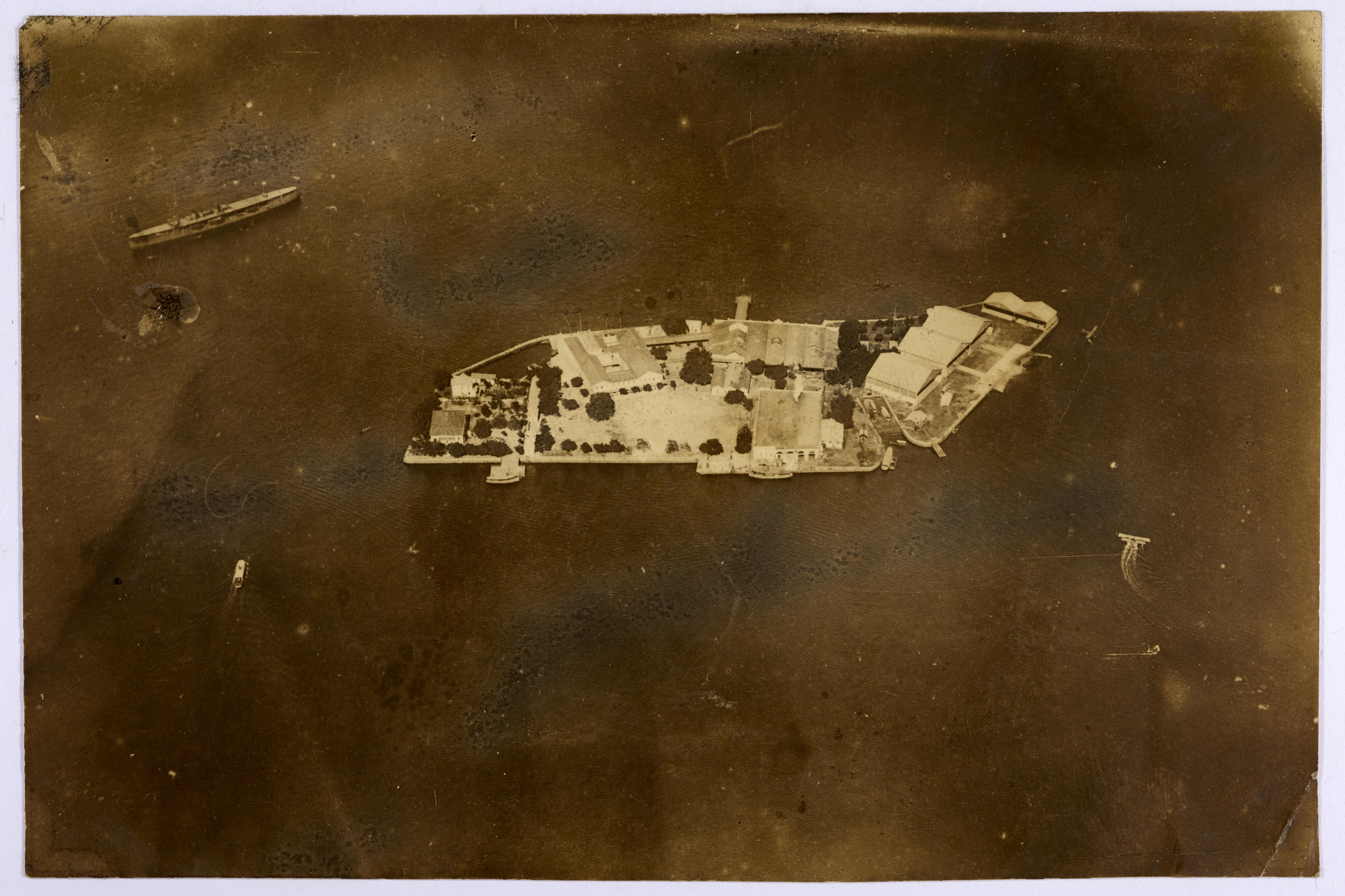
Aerial view of Enxadas Island, with the hangars of the Naval Aviation School on the right

In 1923, Director Guimarães commanded four Curtiss F-5Ls, the "Íbis Squadron", in the largest raid carried out up to that time by Brazilian military aircraft, taking advantage of the power of the new models. Taking off from Ilha das Enxadas on 1 July at 10:15 a.m., they landed in Vitória at 1:50 p.m., from where they departed the following morning at 9:00 a.m. and landed in Salvador at 3:30 p.m., where they remained until the 18th. From there, they reached their final destination in Aracaju, from which they would begin the return trip, totaling 25 flight hours over about three thousand kilometers of distance. These were unprecedented distances that tested the pilots' endurance and were a sensation among local populations, who had never seen a seaplane before. Along the way, the aviators participated in the celebrations of the Independence of Bahia. In Aracaju, Guimarães gave a speech on the "role of Naval Aviation in Brazil, which is not only to safeguard our coasts against possible external attacks". It would also be to encourage industry and civil aviation and, through the "constant raids of naval aviators to cities distant from the country's capital, bring them an awareness of national unity and strength".

On 3 August 1926, three Avro 504Ks led by Lieutenant Commander Heitor Varady took off from Campo dos Afonsos for Belo Horizonte. All the aircraft were lost or seriously damaged on the return trip. In 1931, Commander Schorcht took advantage of the long range of the Savoia-Marchetti S.55As, leading seven of them to represent Brazil on Argentina's national day, 9 July, and on Uruguay's Constitution Day, 18 July 1931. Two of the aircraft were lost on the return when they alighted in Guanabara Bay, with two fatalities. From 18–22 June 1939, the students and instructors of the EAvN flew 21 Pintassilgos on a round trip to Santos.

=== Battles and conspiracies ===
==== 1920s ====
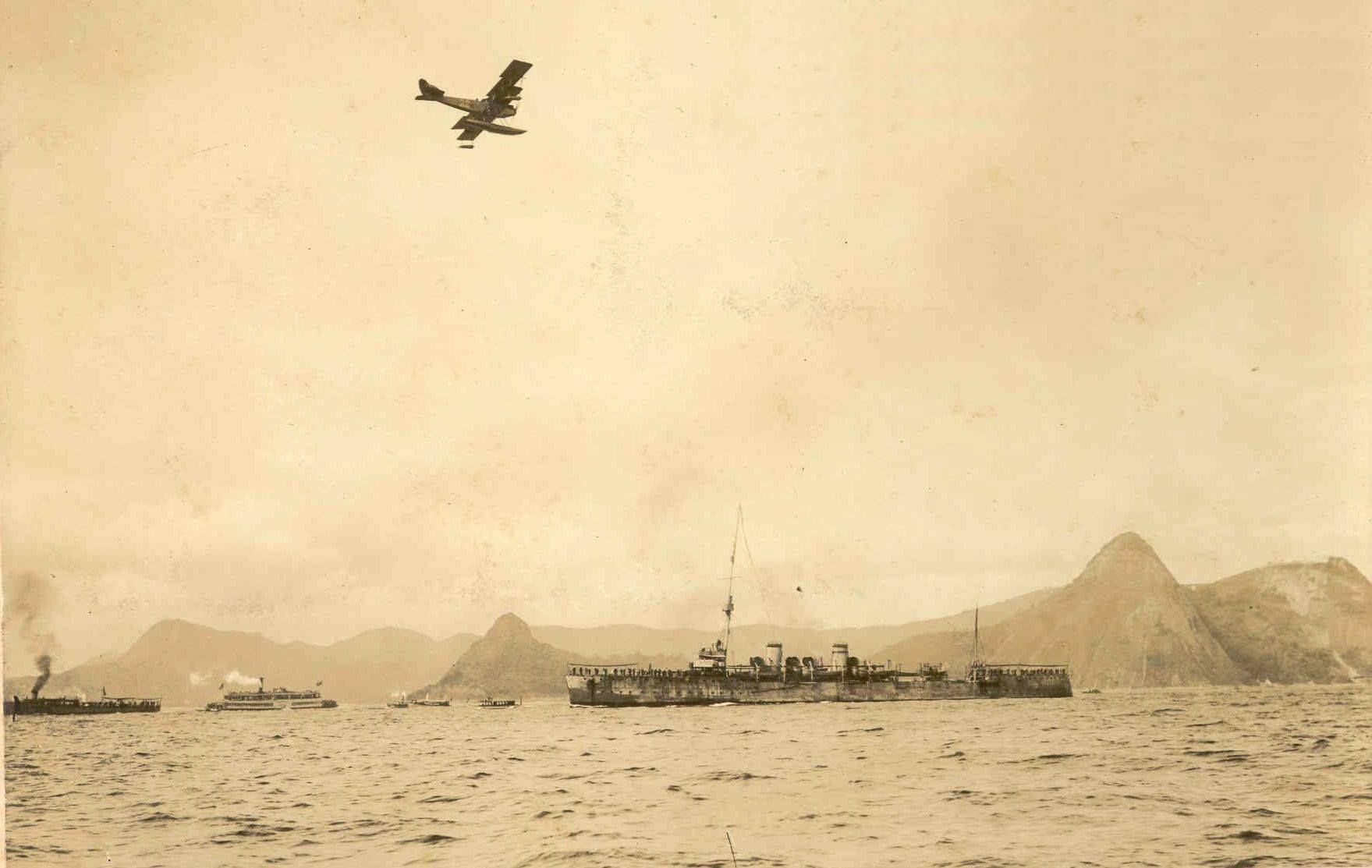
Seaplane flying over the destroyer Rio Grande do Norte

The climate of military indiscipline during the 1922 presidential election spread to naval aviators. On 28 April, a conspiracy was uncovered involving lieutenants from the Naval Aviation School to attack the entourage of President Epitácio Pessoa during his descent from Petrópolis to Rio de Janeiro, in coordination with sailors from the battleship Minas Geraes, with the aim of spreading a revolt throughout the rest of the Fleet and the Army. The plot was reported by Corporal Jonas. Lieutenants Belisário Moura, Fábio de Sá Earp, Backer Azamor, Flávio dos Santos, and others were arrested, but the leader of the uprising was never identified. Aircraft were dismantled and the school was shut down. The inquiry failed to prove that the lieutenants had committed a military crime, and they were merely dismissed from Naval Aviation and transferred to Manaus, Recife, Natal, and other distant garrisons.

This event foreshadowed within the Navy the military movement known as tenentism, whose first episode was the Copacabana Fort Revolt, launched by Army officers in July of the same year. Two Curtiss HS-2L aircraft dropped bombs against Fort Copacabana, but missed their targets. In response to the São Paulo Revolt of 5 July 1924, Minister Alexandrino ordered that a squadron of bombing seaplanes (Curtiss F-5L) be kept on standby to operate in Rio de Janeiro. One of the seaplanes always had its crew on board. Not even the pilots knew the reason for this measure, as the government distrusted even them.

To support the occupation operations along the coast of São Paulo, three Curtiss F-5L aircraft from the 1st Squadron of the Bomber Flotilla - the only operational unit - were deployed under Lieutenant Commander Schorcht. In eight days of work, ground crews managed to make four more aircraft operational, forming the 2nd Squadron. Two Curtiss HS-2L aircraft also departed. Naval Aviation conducted reconnaissance flights over São Vicente, Bertioga, and Conceição de Itanhaém, as well as patrol flights over Santos. On the 19th, Lieutenant Fernando Savaget attempted to take off to intercept an enemy aircraft flying over the Fleet at Santos, but capsized in the water. Savaget managed to escape alive. The enemy, tenentist leader Eduardo Gomes, left the area under anti-aircraft fire.

In August, two Curtiss MF aircraft accompanied the Northern Detachment, a task force charged with ascending the Amazon River and suppressing another rebellion, the Manaus Commune. The only effective obstacle was Fort Óbidos. On the 24th, after the fort's defenders were ordered to surrender, the two seaplanes took off from Santarém and bombed the surroundings of the enemy position, under orders not to damage the city. The following day the fort was occupied without resistance: the entire garrison deserted during the night. This marked the decisive moment in the defeat of the movement.

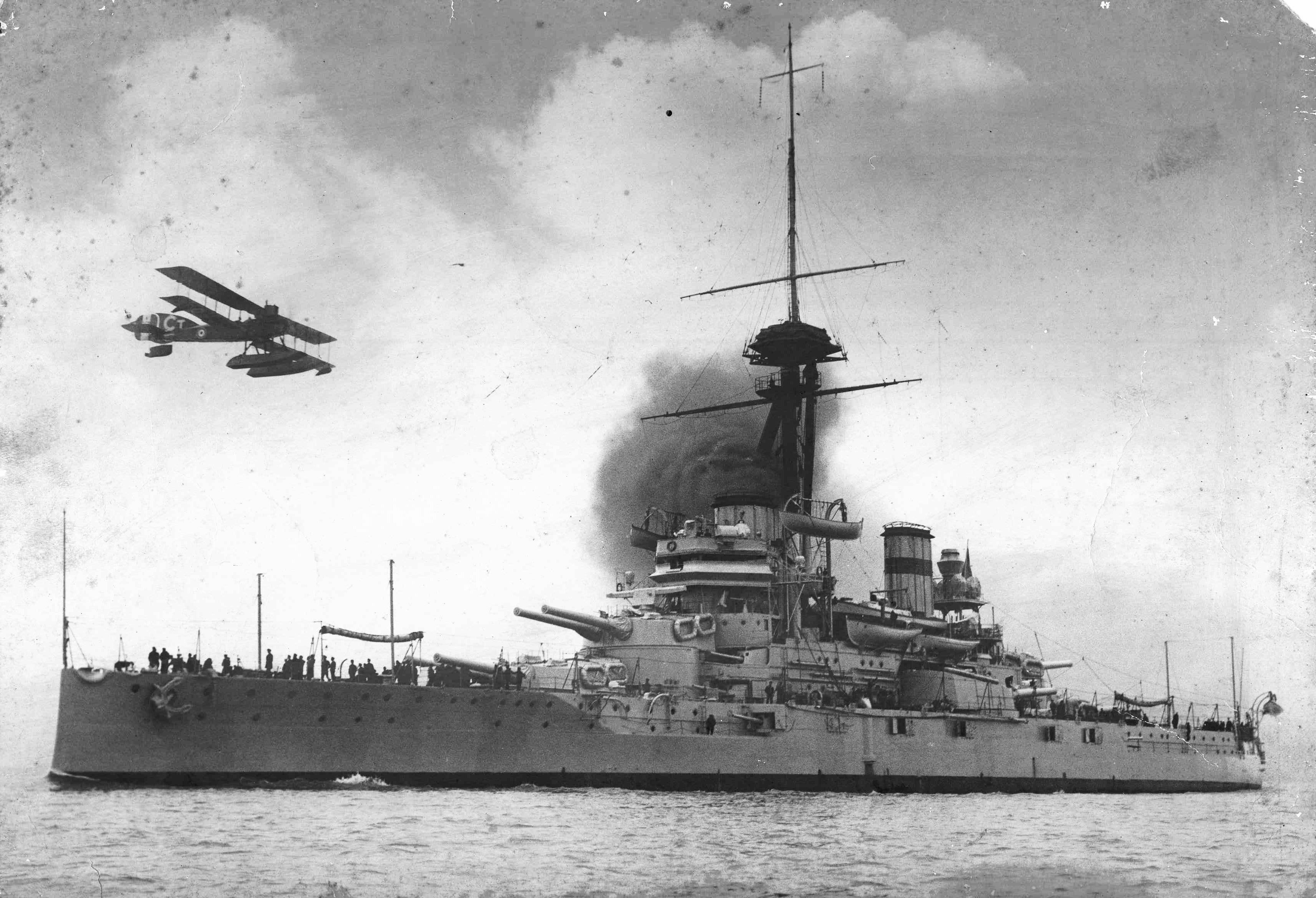
Seaplane and battleship São Paulo

In Rio de Janeiro, Director Protógenes' conspiracy to incite the Fleet continued. On the scheduled date - the night of 20–21 October 1924 - Lieutenant Commander Esculápio Cezar de Paiva seized command of the Naval Aviation Center on Governador Island. Nearly all the officers, with the exception of the commanding officer, Graça Aranha, were part of the movement. Esculápio mobilized the garrison, informed them of the imminent revolt, and outlined the plans: the torpedo boat Goyaz would pick up the personnel and take them to the Aviation School, where they would meet other sympathizers. An N-9 aircraft would fly over Vila Militar to signal allied Army officers, and a group of F-5 aircraft would bomb the Catete Palace, the Ministry of the Navy, and other locations "in order to compel the President of the Republic to leave office'. When the expected signal for the uprising did not come, he demobilized the garrison and ordered the destruction of all evidence.

Weeks after the Protógenes conspiracy was uncovered, on 4 November, Navy officers mutinied aboard the battleship São Paulo. Other conspirators attempted to incite Naval Aviation but managed little more than to get a Curtiss N-9H airborne and, together with comrades from the Naval School, take control of the torpedo boat Goyaz. Sergeant-pilot Bráulio Gouveia, in possession of the N-9, joined the rebels aboard São Paulo and tied the aircraft to the ship's stern. A shell sank the seaplane, but the ship continued on toward the open sea. Commander Carlos Alves de Souza, director of the Naval Aviation School, received orders to attack the battleship. Three F-5L aeroboats armed with bombs were dispatched, but without success. In the following days, reconnaissance flights from Rio de Janeiro and Florianópolis failed to locate the battleship, which had taken refuge in Montevideo. As a result of the insubordinations, the government imposed the previously mentioned punishment on the Naval Aviation budget.

==== 1930s ====
In October 1931, an NY-2 embarked aboard the Belmonte conducted reconnaissance flights over Recife following a revolt in the 21st Battalion of Caçadores. In January of the following year, two Martin PM-1B and four SM.55A were deployed to João Pessoa as a precaution against the risk of another uprising, but it was not necessary to employ the aircraft.

During the Constitutionalist Revolution of 1932, some naval aviators went to São Paulo to join the rebels. The remainder of Naval Aviation remained loyal to the government, serving under the direct operational control of the naval authorities. It operated in support of the Fleet, in the naval blockade of the Port of Santos and in the operations of the Mato Grosso Flotilla, and cooperated with Military Aviation in the Paraíba Valley and on the southern front. The units employed were the 18th Observation Division, with four Vought 02V-2A Corsair; the Independent Mixed Flotilla of Patrol Aircraft, with three Martin PM and seven Savoia Marchetti S.55A; and an additional twelve de Havilland DH 60 and two Avro 504 for liaison, reconnaissance, and observation. The air war was serious, and the rebel forces possessed armed aircraft.

Operations at Santos began on 12 July, with the deployment of three Savoia Marchetti and two Martin PM to Vila Bela, on São Sebastião Island. The landing strip was later extended to receive two Vought Corsair. The mission was to support the blockade of the Port of Santos. The aircraft flew liaison and mail missions between Rio de Janeiro and the coast of São Paulo and, in the very first days, overflew cities in São Paulo state, dropping newspapers from Rio de Janeiro and the Imprensa Nacional. On 13 July, a low-level overflight over Santos caused the population to pour into the streets in fear of a bombing. In support of the Army, three attempts to attack Cubatão in July produced no significant results. The small bomb load was unable to paralyze the power plant that supplied São Paulo's industries. A larger round of patrol, reconnaissance, and attack flights along the São Paulo coast coincided with the intensification of the ground offensive in the second half of August. Two attacks on Fort Itaipu in early September destroyed several guns. In the second attack, more than 1.1 tons of bombs were dropped.

Two Corsair aircraft were kept on alert at Galeão to support Military Aviation in the Paraíba Valley. Although designated for observation and bombing, they ultimately served as escorts. In the Paraty–Cunha region, the aircraft supported the offensive of the Marine Corps. On 18 July, two Corsair were fired upon by anti-aircraft guns and intercepted a rebel Potez aircraft, which escaped into cloud cover–a rare encounter with enemy aviation. On the 21st, the patrol succeeded in attacking a mortar battery. On 12 August, two Corsair were deployed to Faxina (present-day Itapeva), on the southern front of the conflict. A third was damaged during a transfer on the 20th. In Mato Grosso, Avro 504 aircraft arrived in August in response to a Falcon of the São Paulo aviation that had been attacking the monitor Pernambuco on the Paraguay River. However, these aircraft were operationally inferior to the Falcon and did not engage in combat.

On 22 January 1933, in response to the Colombia–Peru War, three Fairey Gordon aircraft from the 4th DEB departed for the border town of Tabatinga, Amazonas. The journey was long and arduous, including the loss of one of the aircraft. From Belém onward, the trip was made aboard a merchant ship, owing to a lack of suitable weather conditions and refueling facilities. The stay in Tabatinga was difficult but uneventful. In December of the following year, another detachment departed for Ladário to ensure Brazilian neutrality in a neighboring conflict, the Chaco War, which had already resulted in an attack on a Brazilian merchant vessel. Five Boeing 256 and six Corsair aircraft, under the command of Commander Fernando Vitor Savaget, flew patrols in the region.

=== Aerial demonstrations ===
In January 1932, three Boeing 256 aircraft were sent to Montevideo for the inauguration ceremony of the local airport. Under the leadership of Lieutenant Commander Djalma Cordovil Petit, they were organized into a Demonstration Squadron, which was showcased in all regions of the country over the following two years. On 22 April 1934, it represented Naval Aviation at the closing of the First National Congress of Aeronautics, held at Campo de Marte. Commander Petit decided to perform a solo display, began a looping maneuver, and struck the ground almost vertically. The death of its leader led to the dissolution of the squadron.

=== Aerial navigation ===
Until the 1930s, air navigation relied on nautical or geographical charts produced by the Engineering Club, at a scale of one to one million, supplemented by pilots' own reference notes. In April 1934, the Ministry of the Navy appointed Commander Virgínio de Lamare to organize aerial navigation charts of the coastline and the interior, with Naval Aviation providing support for field surveys. Survey flights began with a Fairey Gordon on the Angra dos Reis–Guaratiba leg. Cartographers and technicians examined aeronautical charts from the United States and other countries to define the desired specifications.

=== Air mail ===
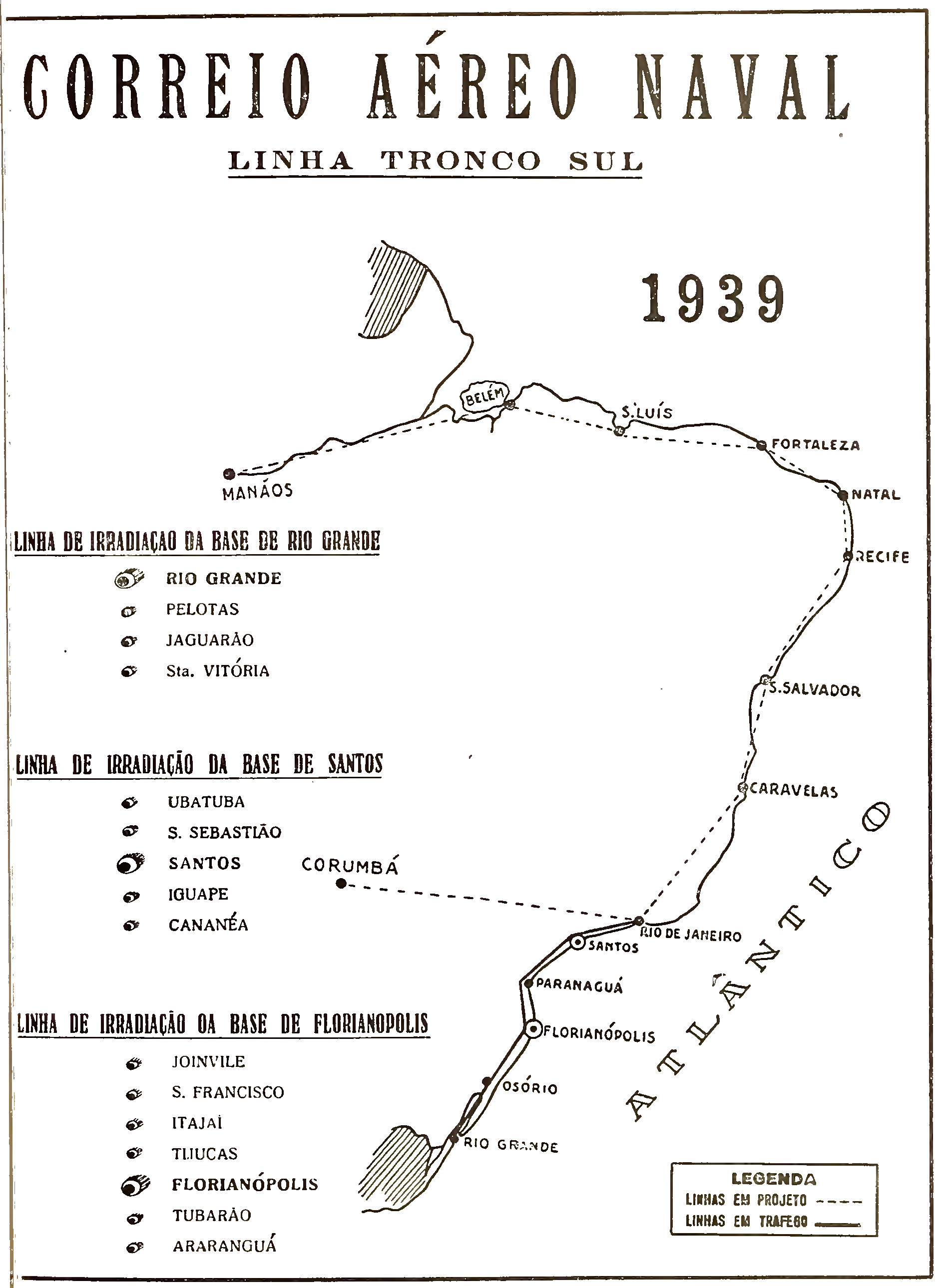
Southern trunk line of the Naval Air Mail in 1939

The first military air mail service in Brazil was the Fleet Air Mail (Correio Aéreo da Esquadra), which emerged in 1919 from the operational needs of exercises on Ilha Grande. In 1934 it was absorbed into a broader service, the Naval Air Mail (Correio Aéreo Naval – CAN), equivalent to the Army's Military Air Mail, but with destinations largely restricted to the coastal belt. The Naval Air Mail served to link naval air bases, to satisfy aviators' desire to fly beyond Rio de Janeiro, to serve locations not covered by commercial airline routes, and to integrate the national territory by connecting the Navy–and the government itself–with local communities, some of them in places not reached by ships. In this respect, it was less consequential than the Army's Military Air Mail, as it served less isolated localities, many of which were already reached by river and lake cabotage.

The first flight took place on the Galeão–Santos–Paranaguá–Florianópolis route, carried out by a Waco aircraft in 1934. The service received its definitive organization on 29 July 1936, becoming a permanent and specialized service under the authority of the Directorate-General of Aeronautics. Pilots flew Waco CSO and CPF F5 seaplanes and Waco F-5, Waco CJC, and Beechcraft D-17A landplanes. They collected mail from localities adjacent to the trunk line, transferred it to the aircraft operating on that line, and carried out the reverse process.

From 1936 onward, there was a trunk line Rio–Santos–Florianópolis–Rio Grande, and at each node, feeder routes: from Rio to Angra, Marambaia, Cabo Frio, Macaé, and Campos; from Santos to Ubatuba, São Sebastião, Iguape, and Cananeia; from Florianópolis to Joinville, São Francisco, Blumenau, Tijucas, Laguna, Tubarão, and Araranguá; and from Rio Grande to Conceição do Arroio, Porto Alegre, Mostardas, Pelotas, and Vitória do Palmar. There were plans to extend the trunk line northward to Manaus and to establish inland routes, but these never operated on a regular basis.

== Legacy ==
The extinction of Naval Aviation was a traumatic moment for the Navy. According to Admiral Renato de Almeida Guillobel, who was not a naval aviator:[126]

"when the Ministry of Aeronautics was created, the Navy was shaken to its foundations (...). It handed over (...) to this new body an enormous stock of materiel, buildings, workshops, housing, vast tracts of land, immense estates that it might not have relinquished and which today it sorely lacks, and, more than all of this, a large number of brilliant officers and enlisted personnel, trained by it and specialized in aeronautical and related matters".

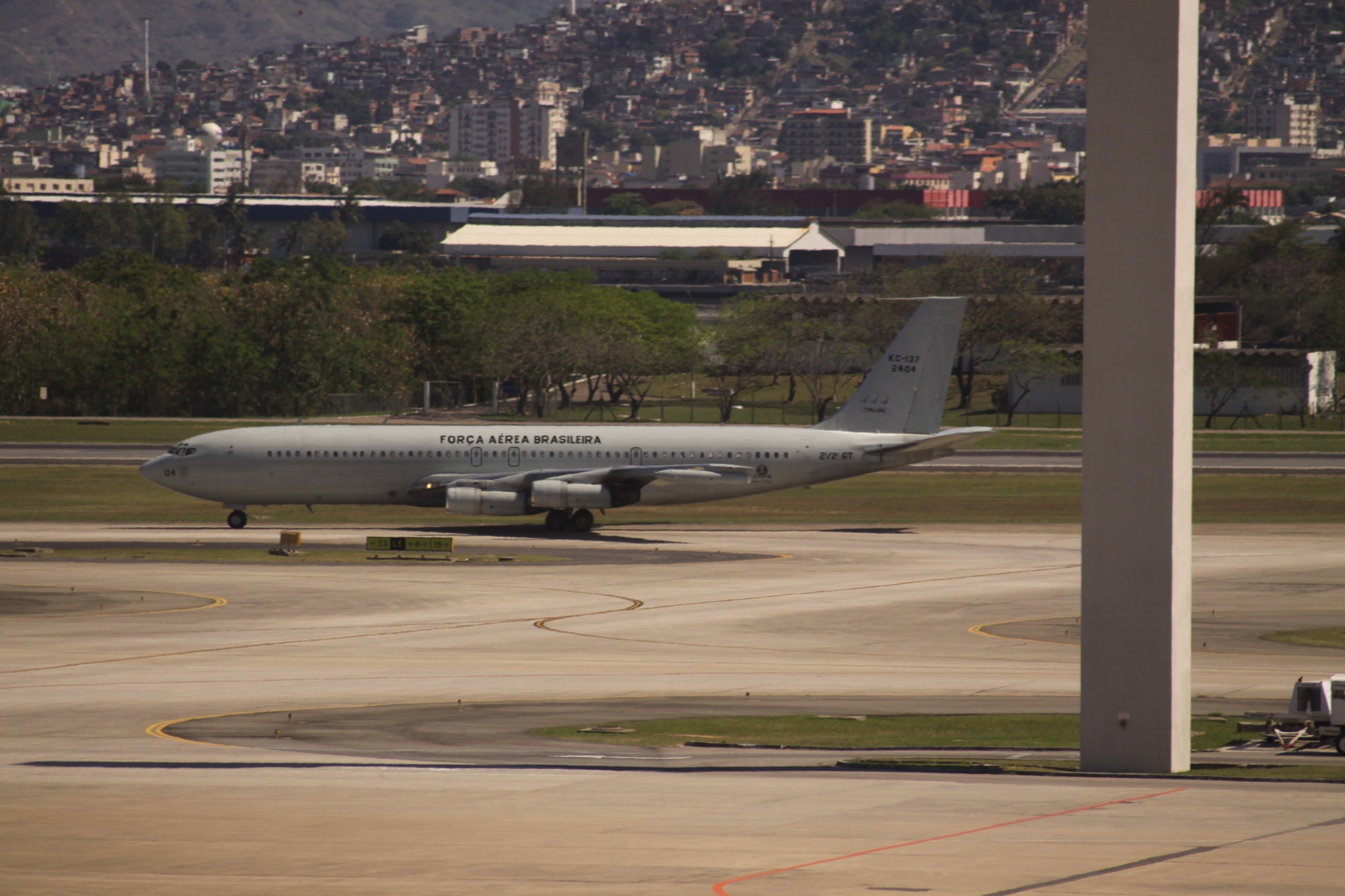
Brazilian Air Force transport aircraft at Galeão Airport, the former Navy air base, in 2012

In the following year, the ministerial report of Admiral Guilhem complained about the disorganization this caused, as even service members from other specialties who served aboard ships and in naval establishments were transferred. The Naval School had to open competitive examinations to admit additional physicians and supply officers. Meanwhile, the newly created Brazilian Air Force centralized instruction at the School of Aeronautics, in the former Army facilities at Campo dos Afonsos, merged the Naval Air Mail and the Military Air Mail to form the National Air Mail, and sent cadets for training in the United States, from where they would go on to fight in the war in Europe, forming a new, homogeneous cadre of personnel. The Galeão manufacturing experiment would be abandoned, and the Air Force would still take years to rebuild its industrial complex.

Former naval aviators made up about 30% of the officer corps of the new force. They inherited the Navy's more elitist culture and were senior in rank compared to colleagues who came from the Army, but they had fewer flight hours. The two groups assigned each other the pejorative nicknames "mariscos" and "canelas pretas". After the first Minister of Aeronautics, the civilian Salgado Filho, five of the next ten ministers came from Naval Aviation, despite its smaller size.

Brazil entered the Second World War without an organic air component within the Navy–a component that proved indispensable for naval warfare. In the Pacific and the Atlantic, the aircraft carrier supplanted the battleship as the principal offensive weapon of fleets. The Brazilian naval campaign against German submarines in the South Atlantic was conducted by the Fleet in conjunction with the United States Armed Forces and the FAB's maritime patrol aviation. The Navy did not come to terms with the loss of its aviation arm and sought to rebuild it in the 1950s, facing opposition from the Air Force, in what became known as the "embarked aviation issue". The conflict would be resolved in 1965, legitimizing the reconstituted Naval Aviation. The current chronology of Naval Aviation delineates a first phase spanning 1916–1941, with subsequent phases beginning in 1952.
