= Brazilian torpedo boat Goyaz =

Torpedo boat

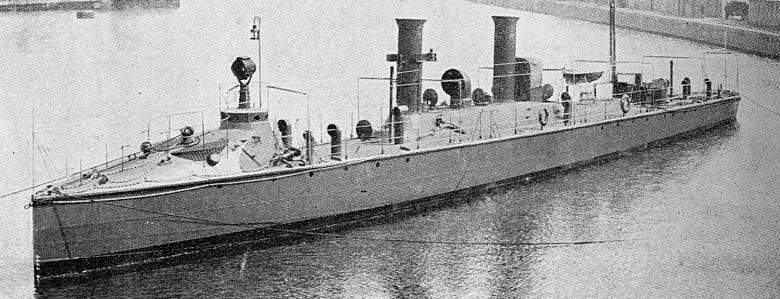

History

Brazil
- Name: Goyaz
- Namesake: Goiás
- Owner: Brazilian Navy
- Builder: Yarrow Shipbuilders
- Launched: 1904
- Commissioned: 9 October 1907
- Decommissioned: 18 August 1933

General characteristics
- Type: Torpedo boat
- Displacement: 152 t (150 long tons)
- Length: 46.5 m (152 ft 7 in)
- Beam: 4.6 m (15 ft)
- Draft: 1.5 m (4 ft 11 in)
- Propulsion: 2 Parsons turbines, 1 alternative steam engine
- Speed: 26 knots (48 km/h; 30 mph)
- Complement: 29
- Armament: 2 × 47 mm Hotchkiss guns; 2 x 45 cm torpedo tubes

Goyaz (Note: The original spelling of the name was Goyaz, which in the current Portuguese language orthography is written as Goiás.) was a torpedo boat operated by the Brazilian Navy from 1907 to 1933. Built by the British shipyard Yarrow & Company with a modern turbine arrangement, the vessel was launched in 1904 and took the name Jeanne. It would have been sold to the Imperial Russian Navy if not for British neutrality in the Russo-Japanese War, remaining at the shipyard until its purchase by the Brazilian Navy.

In Brazil, most of its service was in training midshipmen from the Naval Academy. Goyaz took part in coastal patrols during the First World War and was the only ship to join the battleship São Paulo's revolt in November 1924. The torpedo boat's mutiny lasted only one day: the ship found itself isolated and surrendered after exchanging fire with Brazilian Army forces off the coast of Niterói.

== Construction and purchase ==
The ship was launched in 1904 by Yarrow & Company at its shipyard in Poplar, London, without a defined name or buyer. It would later be called Jeanne by the company, and another almost identical vessel, launched the previous year, was named Caroline. Both were technical successors to the steam yacht Tarantula, itself based on well-established torpedo boat designs but modified with innovative turbine technology. Yarrow had experience in building small, fast ships (whether warships or merchant vessels), a market in which competition centered on hull and propulsion configurations capable of providing the ideal combination of speed, maneuverability, range, and economy. The Jeanne/Caroline class was similar to torpedo boats supplied to the Austrian, Chilean, and Dutch navies.

After the start of the Russo-Japanese War in 1904, the United Kingdom declared neutrality and forbade shipyards from selling to the belligerents. The Russian Empire circumvented this restriction by purchasing Caroline through intermediaries, under the pretext that the vessel would serve as an unarmed yacht. The ship evaded police surveillance and reached the port of Libau, where it was fitted out as a torpedo boat and commissioned into the Imperial Russian Navy under the name Lástochka. Lástochka would serve until 1923 in the Baltic Sea and the Volga River.

After the Caroline scandal, Jeanne was closely monitored by the police and could not be sold to Russian intermediaries. The ship came to the attention of the Brazilian Naval Commission in Europe, which was already familiar with Yarrow's gunboats and was in the process of purchasing vessels for a naval rearmament program. The Brazilian Navy needed a replacement for the torpedo boat Pedro Affonso and also a vessel that could be used for training engineers. In 1907, Brazilian officers inspected Jeanne, which was still docked at the shipyard, and found it in good condition, requiring only minor modifications. On 30 May, representatives of the Naval Commission embarked on speed trials.

The purchase was finalized in June, at the price of 16,000 pounds sterling, of which two thousand included transport. The contract also provided for the dispatch of a Yarrow engineer, Thomas Wood, to Brazil for one year. The ship departed unarmed and would remain so until its arrival in Brazil. It left the River Thames on 4 September 1907, and was towed for most of the journey by the British merchant ship Halizones. On 5 October, it finally arrived in Rio de Janeiro, where it was commissioned under the name Goyaz, the first Brazilian Navy unit named in honor of the state of Goiás. Its first commander was Lieutenant Bento Machado da Silva.

== Characteristics ==
Goyaz was a small vessel: it displaced 152 tonnes (150 long tons), measuring 46.5 meters (152 ft 7 in) in overall length, with a beam of 4.6 meters (15 ft 1 in) and a maximum draft of 1.5 meters (4 ft 11 in). Its propulsion system used two turbines and two boilers, one high- and one low-pressure, along with a reciprocating steam engine. These components powered three shafts and three propellers, the central one driven by the reciprocating engine and the lateral ones by the turbines.

This arrangement was suggested to Yarrow by the Italian engineer Nabor Soliani to increase efficiency at cruising speed, low speed, and when moving astern. The reciprocating engine could be used for economical movement at speeds below 12 knots (22 km/h; 14 mph), when the turbines would consume too much coal. At high speed, the turbines and the engine could be used together. Speed trials showed that an average of 26 knots (48 km/h; 30 mph) could be reached with the turbines in operation. The most notable difference between Caroline/Lástochka and Jeanne/Goyaz was the turbine manufacturer—Rateau in the first case and Parsons in the second—which can be explained by the experimental nature of the class.

The armament consisted of two 47-millimeter (1.9 in) Hotchkiss guns, mounted on single mounts, and two 45-centimeter (18 in) torpedo tubes. The internal arrangement was typical of similar vessels, with the crew quarters aft and the officers' quarters forward. The complement was 29 men: two officers, eight sergeants, and 21 corporals and sailors.

== Service ==
Goyaz served mainly for the training of midshipmen from the Naval Academy, and for that purpose it was usually moored by the stern to the north pier of Enxadas Island. When it left the pier, it normally returned the same day; therefore, the provisions magazine was not stocked, and the midshipmen brought their own meals. The ship was also used in support of the Foca-class submarines. Its routine was interrupted on three occasions. In November 1910, during the time of the Revolt of the Lash, it was crewed only by officers out of fear of a sailors' mutiny. During the First World War it took part in coastal patrols, and in November 1924, it was the only ship to join the revolt of the battleship São Paulo. On three occasions, in 1924–1925, 1931, and 1932, it was subordinated to the Fleet, but always returned to the Naval Academy. The torpedo boat was decommissioned from active service on May 6, 1933, and was struck from the list on August 18 of the same year.

=== 1924 uprising ===
In October 1924, after an attempted tenentist uprising in the Submarine Flotilla, the commander of the torpedo boat, Lieutenant Commander Rodolpho de Souza Burmester, ordered that a boiler and the propulsion engines be kept ready to operate at once. He was wary of the climate of political and military instability and trusted the crew "since it was composed mostly of cabin boys, youths with little time in service and almost ignorant of their profession". Another uprising began on the morning of 4 November. While a group of rebels mutinied aboard the battleship São Paulo, sailors from the Naval Academy and the Naval Aviation School, armed with carbines, seized a barge and a boat and took control of Goyaz without resistance from the crew. Not all the invaders were part of the conspiracy, but they were pressured to join with claims that São Paulo would bombard the island and that the Admiral-Director had ordered them to man Goyaz.

The mutineers took control at 08:45, raising a red revolutionary flag. Including both the crew and the invaders, there were 80 to 90 men aboard, all enlisted, with only two sergeants, one of whom did not belong to the regular crew. The ship had in store only two 47-millimeter shells, 300 clips for ten carbines, and no torpedoes. Water and coal were scarce, and the provisions magazine was empty. Under the orders of sailor Severino Francisco de Paula, Goyaz prepared to sail. The guns were aimed at the Naval Academy, and the launch Missões, moored within shouting and rifle range, was requisitioned to help tow the torpedo boat away from the pier. The plan was now to sail to Boqueirão Island and transport bombs for seaplanes, but this was abandoned due to lack of support from Naval Aviation. An envoy in the sixth launch of São Paulo ordered the torpedo boat to sail to the battleship, which at that moment was anchored off the Catete Palace, on Flamengo Beach.

Halfway to São Paulo lay the other battleship of the squadron, Minas Geraes, under legalist control. To avoid its guns, the torpedo boat departed at 10:00 and did not take the direct route but skirted the city of Niterói at greater distance, where any bombardment would hit the civilian population. On the way to Viana Island, Goyaz was cheered by political prisoners on the prison ship Campos. Minas Geraes had clear visibility, but the Minister of the Navy ordered it not to fire, since Goyaz had its torpedo tube trained on the battleship and the legalists did not know it carried no torpedoes. The American naval attaché, in a report to his superiors, was astonished by the ease of navigation of the mutinous torpedo boat.

The rebels continued toward São Paulo, which was crossing the bar of Guanabara Bay under heavy fire from Army coastal fortresses. Passing Villegagnon Island and nearing Fort Laje, Goyaz came under attack from the fortresses of Pico and Santa Cruz. The crew realized the precariousness of their situation and changed course to shelter from the guns, steering toward Jurujuba Cove and grounding at São Francisco Cove, where they lowered the red flag and raised the white flag. The sixth launch of São Paulo followed the torpedo boat. Goyaz trained its 47 mm gun on the launch Carlos Maximiano, and five of the first rebels boarded it. Promising to gather information and an aircraft from the Naval Aviation School, they left the site but landed elsewhere and escaped by land.

Army artillery and a detachment of the 2nd Light Infantry Battalion, armed with machine guns, attacked the torpedo boat despite the white flag, and it replied with carbines and a single shot from the 47 mm gun. Goyaz put to sea from the cove, released the tow of São Paulo's launch, and attempted to escape to surrender to Minas Geraes or return to Enxadas Island. At 13:50 it left Jurujuba Cove and was hit in the condenser, losing vacuum, which disabled its main engine. Even so, aided by the tide, it reached the southern side of Boa Viagem Island. Two launches, one Army and one Navy, approached the torpedo boat to demand its surrender. The Navy launch reached it first, and the torpedo boat proceeded escorted by the tugs Laurindo Pitta and Sabino Barroso.

Commander Antônio Sabino Cantuária Guimarães, a legalist who boarded the torpedo boat, ordered the crew to cheer the Minister of the Navy as they passed Minas Geraes, "to demonstrate that they were not in rebellion". At 14:40 the Minister ordered that they be taken prisoner to the Naval Battalion. Captain Burmester, who had only arrived at the Naval Academy at 09:30, resumed command. The brief official note, reporting the surrender of "the only element at the disposal of the rebel faction of São Paulo's crew", occupied the front page of the newspapers. Some of the rebels, together with the prisoners from Campos, were transferred to the penal colony of Clevelândia.

== See also ==
- List of historical ships of the Brazilian Navy
